= Ronald S. Wilson =

American psychologist and behavioral geneticist (1933–1986)

- Born: March 30, 1933
- Died: November 16, 1986 (aged 53)
- Education: Davidson College; Yale University
- Known for: Twin studies
- Awards: Socio-Psychological Prize from the American Association for the Advancement of Science (1979); James Shields Award from the International Society for Twin Studies (1980)
- Scientific career
- Fields: Behavioral genetics
- Institutions: University of Iowa; University of Louisville
- Thesis: Personality patterns and source attractiveness as joint determinants of conformity (1959)

Ronald S. Wilson (March 30, 1933 – November 16, 1986) was an American clinical psychologist and behavioral geneticist. At the time of his death, he was a Professor of Pediatrics at the University of Louisville and director of the Louisville Twin Study, as well as president of the Behavior Genetics Association. He joined the faculty of the University of Louisville School of Medicine in 1965 and became director of the Louisville Twin Study there in 1967; he held both positions from then until his death. Originally an associate professor at the University of Louisville, he was promoted to the rank of full professor there in 1971. He was a fellow of the American Association for the Advancement of Science and the American Psychological Association, as well as a member of the Society for the Study of Human Biology and a founding fellow of the International Society for Twin Studies, of which he served as vice president from 1980 to 1983. In 1979, he received the American Association for the Advancement of Science's Socio-Psychological Prize, and in 1980, he received the James Shields Award from the International Society for Twin Studies. He was elected president-elect of the Behavior Genetics Association in 1984. He died of a heart attack while playing tennis on November 16, 1986.
