= John K. Hewitt =

British-American behavioral geneticist (born 1952)

- Born: John Keith Hewitt; July 14, 1952; Hampshire, England
- Citizenship: United States
- Education: Institute of Psychiatry, Psychology and Neuroscience, University of London; University of Birmingham
- Awards: Dobzhansky Award (2008), James Shields Award (2016)
- Scientific career
- Fields: Psychology; Behavioral genetics
- Workplaces: University of Colorado Boulder
- Thesis: The Genetic Control of Activity, Reactivity and Learning in a Population of Wild Rats (rattus Norvegicus). (1978)
- Academic advisors: David Fulker, Lindon Eaves

John Keith Hewitt (born July 14, 1952) is a British-American behavioral geneticist and professor of psychology and neuroscience at the University of Colorado Boulder and a faculty fellow at the Institute for Behavioral Genetics. He was the Director of the Institute for Behavioral Genetics from 2000 - 2021. He became a naturalized citizen of the United States in 1996.

== Career ==
Hewitt was the editor-in-chief of the journal Behavior Genetics (2001–2025) and president of the Behavior Genetics Association. He received the Dobzhansky Award of the Behavioral Genetics Association in 2008 and the James Shields Award of the International Society for Twin Studies in 2016.
