= Nancy Segal =

American psychologist (born 1951)

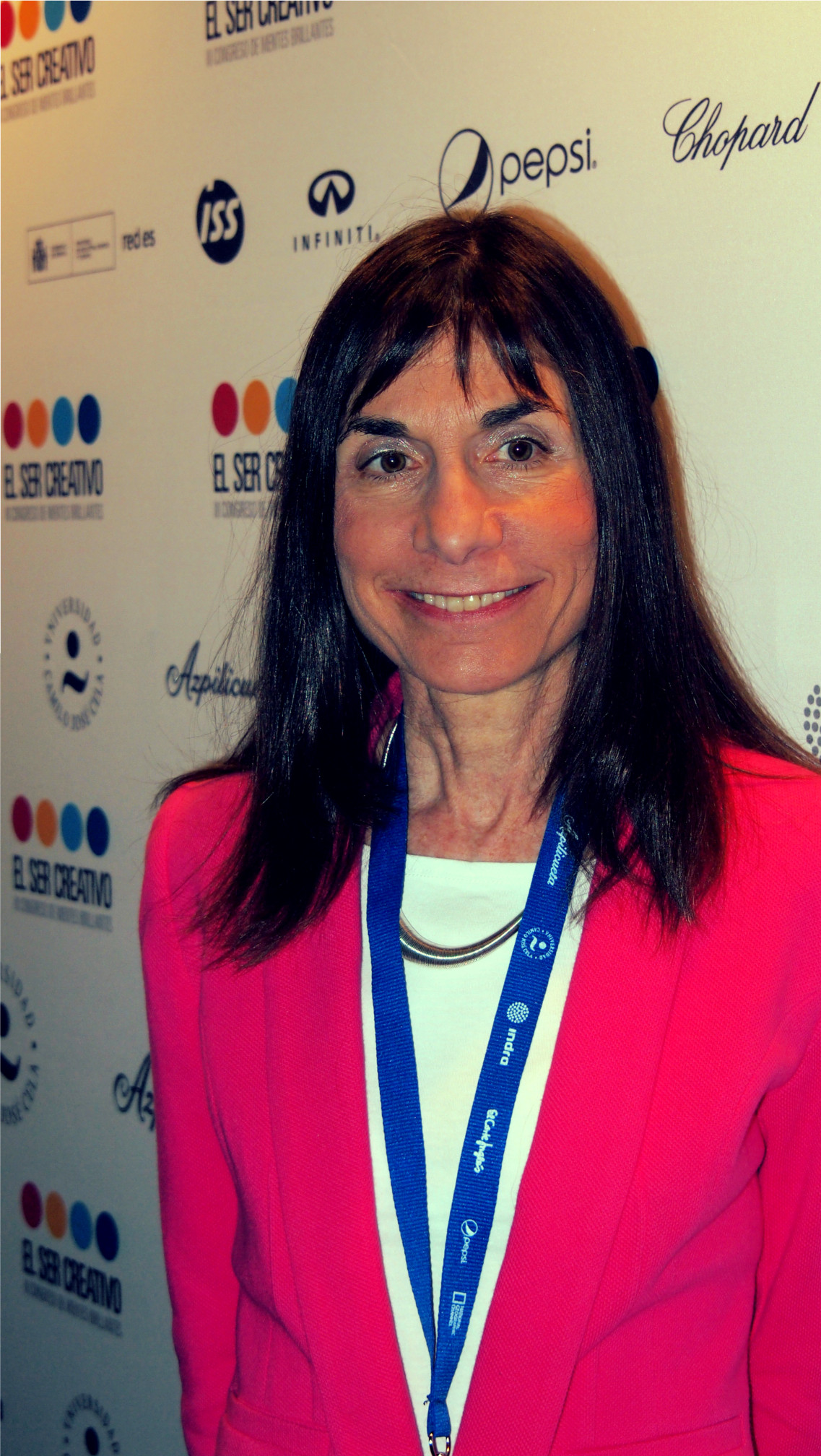
- Segal in 2012
- Born: 1951 (age 74–75); Boston, Massachusetts, U.S.

Academic background
- Education: Boston University (BA); University of Chicago (MA, PhD)

Academic work
- Discipline: Psychologist
- Sub-discipline: Evolutionary psychology; Behavioral genetics; Twin research
- Institutions: California State University, Fullerton

Nancy L. Segal is an American evolutionary psychologist and behavioral geneticist, specializing in the study of twins. She is the professor of developmental psychology and director of the Twin Studies Center, at California State University, Fullerton. Segal was a recipient of the 2005 James Shields Award for Lifetime Contributions to Twin Research from the Behavior Genetics Association and International Society for Twin Studies.

== Early life and education ==
Nancy L. Segal was born a twin in Boston, Massachusetts. She grew up in the Riverdale neighbourhood of the Bronx. She received a B.A. from Boston University (psychology, with honors and English literature, double major, 1973), a M.A. from the University of Chicago (Division of Social Sciences, 1974), and was awarded a Ph.D. from the University of Chicago (Committee on Human Development, 1982).

== Career ==
Segal is the professor of developmental psychology and director of the Twin Studies Center, at California State University, Fullerton. She was recognized as CSU Fullerton's 2004–2005 Outstanding Professor of the Year, as well as the 2004–2005 Distinguished Professor in Humanities and Social Sciences. Segal also received the 2005 James Shields Award for Lifetime Contributions to Twin Research from the Behavior Genetics Association and International Society for Twin Studies.

Segal is a Fellow of the American Psychological Association, American Psychological Society and Western Psychological Association. She has been inducted into the Collegium of Distinguished Alumni at Boston University. Segal is an Associate Editor for the journal, Twin Research and Human Genetics, was Contributing Research Editor for Twins Magazine from 1984 to 1998, and is a member of the advisory board for the Center for Loss in Multiple Birth. She served as assistant director of the Minnesota Center for Twin and Adoption Research, in the Department of Psychology at the University of Minnesota, 1985–1991. She has appeared on Good Morning America, The Oprah Winfrey Show, Dateline NBC and the Today Show, in addition to other nationally and locally televised programs. Her research interests include genetic and environmental influences on human behavior, especially social relationships and bereavement. Her research program includes twin and adoption studies that are specially designed to address problems and issues concerning human development in general, and twin development in particular.

=== Research ===
Segal's main research focuses on human behavior and includes cooperation and competition, altruism, personal bonds, and bereavement. She studies twins to understand social relationships in the general population, hoping to derive implications for what makes people get along. She finds that identical twins generally work together more cooperatively than others.

In addition to studying identical twins (who result from the splitting of one egg fertilized by one sperm and who share all of their genes) and fraternal twins (who come from two eggs fertilized by different sperm and who share on average half their genes, just as non-twin siblings do), Segal is the only researcher known to study "virtual" or "pseudo" twins. These are two people less than nine months apart in age but with different biological parents, who are raised together from infancy. Her studies in progress show a modest degree of similarity in virtual twins for general intelligence and special mental abilities.

Segal sees great promise in a related new area of research, epigenomics, which refers to natural chemical modifications that take place in individual genomes, marking them for increased or decreased activity.

Over the years, Segal has served as an expert witness on legal cases involving twins, in particular, wrongful death, injury, medical negligence, and custody. A paper reporting this work was published in a special issue of the journal Law and Human Behavior. Additional details about this area of study appear in her book, Entwined Lives.

Each year, Segal offers a seminar on behavior genetics and evolutionary psychology to graduate students in the Department of Psychology at CSU Fulleron. She has sponsored undergraduate and graduate research projects involving original twin research designs and methods.

== Personal life ==
Segal has a twin sister, Anne.

== Selected works ==
=== Books ===
- Gay Fathers, Twin Sons: The Citizenship Case that Captured the World. Rowman & Littlefield. 2023.
- The Twin Children of the Holocaust: Stolen Childhood and the Will to Survive. Photographs from the Twins’ 40th Anniversary Reunion at Auschwitz-Birkenau. Segal, Nancy L., and David G. Marwell. Academic Studies Press. 2023.
- Deliberately Divided: Inside the Controversial Study of Twins and Triplets Adopted Apart. Rowman & Littlefield. 2021. The book looks at twins and triplets deliberately separated in the 1960s and the secret study that followed them.
- Accidental Brothers: The Story of Twins Exchanged at Birth and the Power of Nature and Nurture. Segal, Nancy L., and Yesika S. Montoya. 2018. New York: St. Martin's Press.
- Born Together-Reared Apart: The Landmark Minnesota Twin Study, was published by Harvard University Press in June 2012. It surveys the origins, methods, findings and controversies from the Minnesota Study of Twins Reared Apart.
- Someone Else's Twin: The True Story of Babies Switched at Birth, published in 2011 by Prometheus Books tells the story of identical twin girls born in Spain's Canary Islands, one of whom was accidentally exchanged for a singleton infant. The twins were reunited at age twenty-eight. The book also includes research on twins reared apart and information on several other switched at birth twin cases.
- Indivisible by Two: Lives of Extraordinary Twins (Harvard University Press). This collection of essays on twelve twin, triplet and quadruplet sets brings together humanity and science in a unique way.
- Entwined Lives: Twins and What They Tell Us About Human Behavior (E. P. Dutton, 1999). This survey of twins and twin research includes chapters on the biology of twinning, twin research methodology, findings on intelligence, personality, mental disorders and athletic prowess, studies of twin relationships, information on twins raised apart, findings on "pseudo-twins" or same-age unrelated children raised together, non-human twinning, new fertility treatments, life histories of noteworthy twins, legal issues involving twins, conjoined twins and a survey of nature-nurture issues.
- With G. E. Weisfeld and C. C. Weisfeld, Segal is the co-editor of Uniting Psychology and Biology: Integrative Perspectives on Human Development (American Psychological Association Press, 1997). This book, which resulted from a festschrift in honor of her mentor Professor Daniel G. Freedman at the University of Chicago, brings together a series of current papers on behavioral-genetic, ethological, cultural and evolutionary approaches to human behavior.

=== Articles and essays ===
Segal's papers have appeared in journals, such as American Psychologist, Child Development and Science. She has received research grants from the National Science Foundation, the American Psychological Association and the Olfactory Research Fund, Ltd. She was named a Dean's Faculty Scholar for the Spring, 1999 semester. She addressed the National Organization of Mothers of Twin in St. Louis, in 1999, the New Zealand Organization of Mothers of Twins in 2000, and 2007.
