= Nancy Pedersen =

American genetic epidemiologist

Nancy L. Pedersen
- Born: Nancy Lee Pedersen; Minnesota, United States
- Education: University of Minnesota; University of Colorado
- Known for: Twin studies
- Awards: James Shields Award for Lifetime Contributions to Twin Research from the International Society for Twin Studies (2007); Dobzhansky Award from the Behavior Genetics Association (2014)
- Scientific career
- Fields: Genetic epidemiology
- Institutions: Karolinska Institutet
- Thesis: Genetic and environmental factors for usage of common drugs (1980)
- Academic advisors: Gerald McClearn

Nancy L. Pedersen is an American genetic epidemiologist. She is Professor of Genetic Epidemiology and the leader of the Swedish Adoption/Twin Study of Aging (SATSA) at the Karolinska Institutet in Stockholm, Sweden. She is known for her research on human twins, much of which is based on the Swedish Twin Registry. This has included research on the genetic basis of Alzheimer's disease and self-confidence.

== Education ==
After graduating from Brainerd High School in Brainerd, Minnesota, Pedersen received her B.A. degree in psychology from the University of Minnesota in 1974, where she graduated magna cum laude. She went on to earn her M.A. and Ph.D. degrees in psychology and behavioral genetics from the University of Colorado in 1977 and 1980, respectively.

== Honors and awards ==
Pedersen was elected a fellow of the Gerontological Society of America in 2002. In 2007, she received the James Shields Award for Lifetime Contributions to Twin Research from the International Society for Twin Studies. In 2014, she received the Dobzhansky Award from the Behavior Genetics Association. She was named an ISI Highly Cited Researcher in 2018.
