= Jan Bruell =

American psychologist and geneticist

- Born: Jan Herbert Bruell; December 27, 1920; Bielsko, Poland
- Died: January 21, 1997 (aged 76); Austin, Texas, United States
- Education: University of Heidelberg; Clark University
- Spouse: Tillie
- Children: Sue, Peter, and Steven
- Scientific career
- Fields: Behavioral genetics Medical genetics
- Institutions: Western Reserve University; University of Texas at Austin
- Thesis: Visual egocentric localization: an experimental study (1953)
- Academic advisors: Heinz Werner; Gardner Lindzey

Jan Herbert Bruell (December 27, 1920 – January 21, 1997) was a Polish-born American psychologist and geneticist known for his work in behavioral and medical genetics.

== Professional career ==
He was a professor in the psychology department at the University of Texas at Austin from 1968 until his death in 1997. He was a founding member of the Behavior Genetics Association, and served as editor-in-chief of its flagship journal, Behavior Genetics, from 1978 to 1986.
