= Human behaviour genetics =

Field that examines the role of genetic and environmental influences on human behaviour

Human behaviour genetics is an interdisciplinary subfield of behaviour genetics that studies the role of genetic and environmental influences on human behaviour. Classically, human behavioural geneticists have studied the inheritance of behavioural traits. The field was originally focused on determining the importance of genetic influences on human behaviour (for e.g., do genes regulate human behavioural attributes). It has evolved to address more complex questions such as: how important are genetic and/or environmental influences on various human behavioural traits; to what extent do the same genetic and/or environmental influences impact the overlap between human behavioural traits; how do genetic and/or environmental influences on behaviour change across development; and what environmental factors moderate the importance of genetic effects on human behaviour (gene-environment interaction). The field is interdisciplinary, and draws from genetics, psychology, and statistics. Most recently, the field has moved into the area of statistical genetics, with many behavioural geneticists also involved in efforts to identify the specific genes involved in human behaviour, and to understand how the effects associated with these genes changes across time, and in conjunction with the environment.

Traditionally, the human behavioural genetics were a psychology and phenotype based studies including intelligence, personality and grasping ability. During the years, the study developed beyond the classical traits of human behaviour and included more genetically associated traits like genetic disorders (such as fragile X syndrome, Alzheimer's disease and obesity). The traditional methods of behavioural-genetic analysis provide a quantitative evaluation of genetic and non-genetic influences on human behaviour. The family, twin and adoption studies marks the huge contribution for laying down the foundation for current molecular genetic studies to study human behaviour.

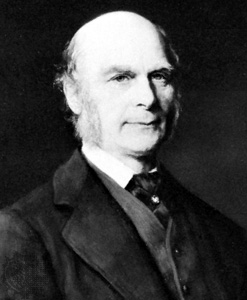
Francis Galton

== History ==
In 1869, Francis Galton published the first empirical work in human behavioural genetics, Hereditary Genius. Here, Galton intended to demonstrate that "a man's natural abilities are derived by inheritance, under exactly the same limitations as are the form and physical features of the whole organic world." Like most seminal work, he overstated his conclusions. His was a family study on the inheritance of giftedness and talent. Galton was aware that resemblance among familial relatives can be a function of both shared inheritance and shared environments. Contemporary human behavioural quantitative genetics studies special populations such as twins and adoptees.

The initial impetus behind this research was to demonstrate that there were indeed genetic influences on human behaviour. In psychology, this phase lasted for the first half of the 20th century largely because of the overwhelming influence of behaviourism in the field. Later behavioural genetic research focused on quantitative methods.

In 1984, a research program named the Swedish Adoption/Twin Study of Aging (SATSA) was initiated in gerontological genetics. The research was executed on Twins Reared Apart (TRA) and Twins Reared Together (TRT). In this three-year interval study, the testing was carried out in two ways, Mail-Out Questionnaire and In-Person Testing (IPT). The IPT includes functional capacity, physical performance measurements, neurological state, general health, cardiovascular health, and cognitive abilities, all of which are particularly significant in ageing. The IPT had two major components for testing, Biomedical and Cognitive Assessment. The biomedical component was constructed to analyses the general health status like age changes, lungs function and capacity, physical strength. With this, the cognitive component was developed to represent and evaluate domains of crystallised and fluid intelligence and memory.

The data acquired from this study allowed researchers to assess genetic contributions to age changes and continuities throughout the length of the SATSA twins' later lives, which prolonged a decade and a half.

== Contemporary behavioural quantitative genetics ==
Behavioural geneticists study both psychiatric and mental disorders, such as schizophrenia, bipolar disorder, and alcoholism, as well as behavioural and social characteristics, such as personality and social attitudes.

Recent trends in behavioural genetics have indicated an additional focus toward researching the inheritance of human characteristics typically studied in developmental psychology. For instance, a major focus in developmental psychology has been to characterise the influence of parenting styles on children. However, in most studies, genes are a confounding variable. Because children share half of their alleles with each parent, any observed effects of parenting styles could be effects of having many of the same alleles as a parent (e.g. harsh aggressive parenting styles have been found to correlate with similar aggressive child characteristics: is it the parenting or the genes?). Thus, behaviour genetics research is currently undertaking to distinguish the effects of the family environment from the effects of genes. This branch of behaviour genetics research is becoming more closely associated with mainstream developmental psychology and the sub-field of developmental psychopathology as it shifts its focus to the heritability of such factors as emotional self-control, attachment, social functioning, aggressiveness, etc.

Several academic bodies exist to support behaviour genetic research, including the International Behavioural and Neural Genetics Society, Behavior Genetics Association, the International Society of Psychiatric Genetics, and the International Society for Twin Studies. Behaviour genetic work features prominently in several more general societies, for instance the International Behavioral Neuroscience Society.

== Methods of human behavioural genetics ==
Human behavioural geneticists use several designs to try to answer questions about the nature and mechanisms of genetic influences on behaviour. All of these designs are unified by being based around human relationships which disentangle genetic and environmental relatedness.

The cornerstone of behavioural genetics approaches is quantitative genetics theories, which were formulated more than half a century ago by geneticists concerned with the practical challenges of increasing economically relevant characteristics of domestic plants and animals. These methods are used to study a myriad of traits, including intelligence and other cognitive abilities, personality traits like extraversion and emotionality, and psychiatric disorders such as schizophrenia and bipolar disease.

=== Traditional methods of behavioural-genetic analysis ===
To examine genetic and environmental impacts on complex human behavioural traits, researchers uses three classic methods: family, twin, and adoption studies. Individual variations within the normal range of variation, as well as the genesis of psychopathologies, are investigated using each of these techniques.

=== Family studies ===
Genes and shared (or familial) environmental factors have a role in family resemblance. The majority of familial research on schizophrenia are concerned with relative risk. Despite the fact that the scope of diagnosis varies, the lifetime risk of schizophrenia in the general population is generally stated as 1%. Siblings of people with schizophrenia, on the other hand, constitute 13% of the population. The hazards for second- and third-degree relatives are lower, at 3% and 2%, respectively, as predicted. In a As a result, schizophrenia is certainly a familial trait.

=== Twin and adoption studies ===
The basic understanding of behavioural genetics requires the separate study of effects of genes and environment influence on human behaviour. Such as, the genetic effects in a trait are discernible if pair of genetically identical (monozygotic twins) are much similar to one another than pair of genetically non-identical (dizygotic twin).

Twin and adoption studies describe the extent to which family resemblance is due to shared genes and the extent to which it is due to shared environments. Behavioral Scientist uses twin studies to examine hereditary and environmental influences on behavioural development.

For instance, some researchers also study adopted twins: the adoption study. The adoption design produces estimates of various genetic and environmental components of variance, similar to the twin design. Furthermore, the adoption design facilitates

(1) the identification of specific environmental influences that are unaffected by heredity (e.g., the effects of life stressors),

(2) the analysis of heredity's role in ostensibly environmental relationships, and

(3) the evaluation of genotype-environment interactions and correlations.

In this case the adoption disentangles the genetic relatedness of the twins (either 50% or 100%) from their family environments. Likewise the classic twin study contrasts the differences between identical and fraternal twins within a family compared to differences observed between families. This core design can be extended: the so-called "extended twin study" which adds additional family members, increasing power and allowing new genetic and environmental relationships to be studied. Excellent examples of this model are the Virginia 20,000 and the QIMR twin studies.

Generally, if the observed behaviour and cognitive traits have a genetic component, then genetically similar relatives resemble to each other as comparative to individuals who share lesser component of genome. In case of environmental influence, researchers study the two broad classes of effects in behavioural genetics such as shared environmental factors causing them to behave similarly and the other one is nonshared environmental factors causing them to behave different from one another. For example, siblings raised together in same environment will have more evident shared environment influences whereas in relative siblings raised apart from each other will have non-shared environmental influence. The understanding of the effects of genes and the influence of shared and nonshared environment on human behaviour provides a comprehensive data for genetic and environmental relatedness.

Also possible are the "children of twins" design (holding maternal genetic contributions equal across children with paternal genetics and family environments) and the "virtual twins" design - unrelated children adopted into a family who are very close or identical in age to biological children or other adopted children in the family. While the classical twin study has been criticised they continue to be of high utility. There are several dozen major studies ongoing in countries as diverse as the US, UK, Germany, France, the Netherlands, and Australia, and the method is used widely on phenotypes as diverse as dental caries, body mass index, ageing, substance abuse, sexuality, cognitive abilities, personality, values, and a wide range of psychiatric disorders. This is broad utility is reflected in several thousands of peer-review papers, and several dedicated societies and journals.

== Contemporary methods of behavioural-genetic analysis: new approaches ==
The approaches improve the capacity to specify and generalise results on the effects of genetic and environmental factors on characteristics and their evolution across time.

=== QTL analysis study ===
Quantitative trait locus (QTL) analysis is a statistical approach for attempting to explain the genetic basis of variation in complex characteristics by linking two types of data: phenotypic data (trait measurements) and genotypic data (typically molecular markers).

Researchers in disciplines as diverse as agriculture, biology, and medicine use QTL analysis to relate complicated traits to particular chromosomal regions. The purpose of this procedure is to determine the action, interaction, quantity, and type of action. The ability to disentangle the genetic component of complex characteristics has been enabled by QTL studies in model systems.

To research behavioural characteristics such as schizophrenia, bipolar disorder, alcoholism, and autism, large-scale national and international alliances have been constructed. Such partnerships will bring together enormous, consistently gathered samples, improving the likelihood of finding real susceptibility gene connections.

=== Biometric model fitting ===
The method is designed in collaboration of quantitative geneticists to enhance the capabilities to delineate between the genetic and environmental components of complex behavioural characteristics. Path analysis and structural equation modelling are two statistical approaches used in this methodology. The approach is used to see if genetic and environmental impacts can be employed in various populations. It would be useful to know how much of the total genetic variance—heritability—is accounted for by a limited selection of potential loci in studies of emotional stability, for example.

== See also ==
- Behavioral epigenetics
- Biocultural evolution
- Genetics of social behavior
- Genomics of personality traits
- Psychiatric genetics
