= Gerald E. McClearn =

American behavior geneticist and professor emeritus

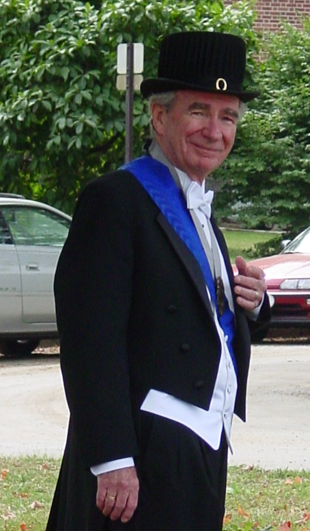
- Receiving honorary degree in 2002
- Born: Gerald Eugene McClearn; July 28, 1927; Sandy Lake, Pennsylvania
- Died: January 5, 2017 (aged 89); State College, Pennsylvania
- Citizenship: United States
- Education: University of Wisconsin; Allegheny College
- Known for: Cognitive aging, behavioral genetics, gerontology
- Awards: Dobzhansky Award (1989), Robert W. Kleemeier Award from the Gerontological Society of America (2009), Fondation IPSEN Longevity Prize
- Scientific career
- Fields: Psychology; Behavioral genetics Gerontological genetics
- Workplaces: Pennsylvania State University; University of Colorado at Boulder
- Thesis: An analysis of differentiation learning by monkeys (1954)
- Doctoral advisor: Harry Harlow
- Notable students: Nancy Pedersen
- Website: bbh.hhdev.psu.edu/faculty-staff/mcclearn

Gerald "Jerry" McClearn (July 28, 1927 – January 5, 2017) was an American behavior geneticist and professor emeritus of health and human development and biobehavioral health at the Pennsylvania State University.

== Education ==
McClearn received his undergraduate degree from Allegheny College and took his Ph.D. in psychology at University of Wisconsin. After two year-long spells as instructor at Yale University, and then assistant professor of psychology at Allegheny College, he took up postdoctoral positions at the University of Edinburgh, Scotland, and University College London.

== Career ==
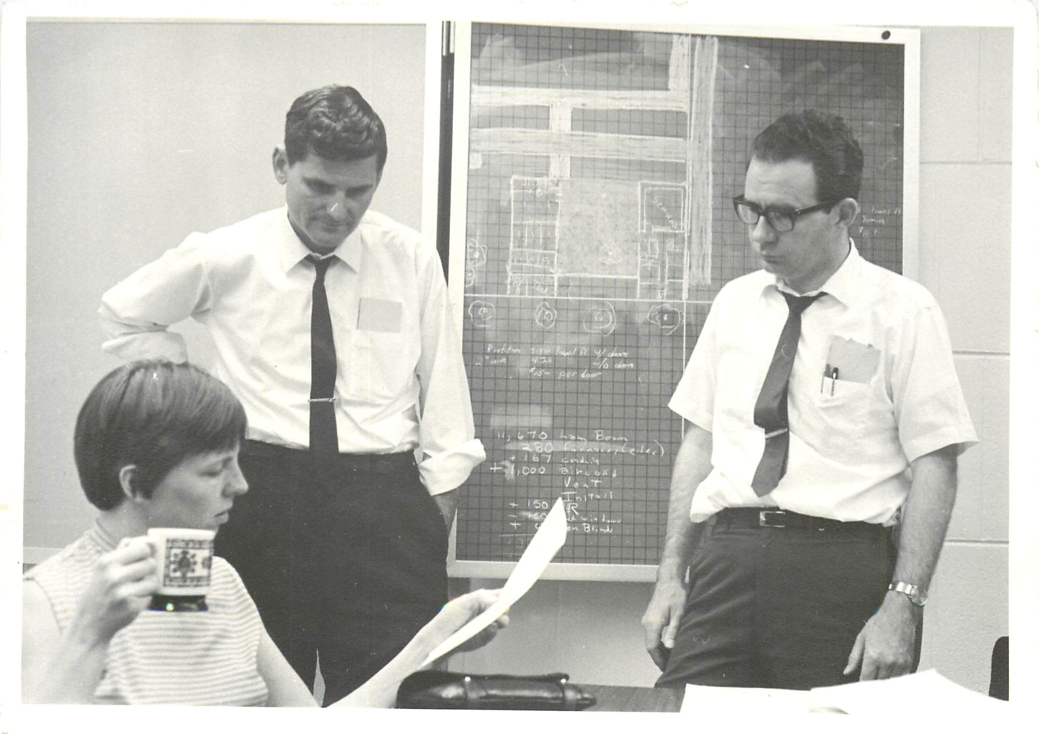
Gerald (Jerry) McClearn, John DeFries and Nancy McClearn already planning expansion of the Institute for Behavior Genetics (IBG), Fall 1967

McClearn was on staff at the Department of Psychology at University of California, Berkeley from 1956 to 1965. He then joined the faculty of the Department of Psychology at University of Colorado Boulder, as an associate professor. Promoted to full professor, he remained at Boulder until 1981.

Early on at Colorado, McClearn planned to form a research institute dedicated to research and teaching in behavioral genetics; he subsequently founded the Institute for Behavioral Genetics at the University of Colorado at Boulder in 1966, and was an early member of the Behavior Genetics Association, becoming one of its first presidents in 1974.

He was the recipient of the Dobzhansky Award in 1989, the Robert W. Kleemeier Award from the Gerontological Society of America (2009) "in recognition for outstanding research in the field of gerontology”, and the Fondation Ipsen's Longevity Prize.

== Selected works ==
=== Books ===
- Gerald E. McClearn; John C. DeFries (1973). Introduction to Behavioral Genetics. San Francisco, CA: W. H. Freeman and Company. ISBN 978-0-7167-0835-3.
- Robert Plomin; John C. DeFries; Gerald E. McClearn (1980). Behavioral Genetics: A Primer. San Francisco, CA: W. H. Freeman and Company.
- Robert Plomin; Gerald E. McClearn, eds. (1993). Nature, Nurture, and Psychology. Washington, DC: American Psychological Association.
