= DeFries–Fulker regression =

Method of multiple regression analysis used in behavioural genetics

In behavioural genetics, DeFries–Fulker (DF) regression, also sometimes called DeFries–Fulker extremes analysis, is a type of multiple regression analysis designed for estimating the magnitude of genetic and environmental effects in twin studies. It is named after John C. DeFries and David Fulker, who first proposed it in 1985. It was originally developed to assess heritability of reading disability in twin studies, but it has since been used to assess the heritability of other cognitive traits, and has also been applied to non-twin methodologies.

== Approach ==
DeFries–Fulker regression analysis is based on the differences in the magnitude of regression to the mean in a genetic trait between monozygotic (MZ) and dizygotic (DZ) twins. In DF regression, the first step is to select probands in a twin study with extreme scores on the trait being studied, and to regression to the mean among their co-twins depending on whether the probands are part of a MZ or DZ twin pair. DF regression is thus based on the assumption that, to the extent that genetic factors play a role in causing the extreme variation in the studied trait, the magnitude of regression to the mean should be greater in DZ co-twins of probands than in their MZ counterparts. This should result in MZ co-twins being more similar to their probands on the trait under study than DZ twins are to theirs.

=== Modifications ===
Since the DF regression approach was first proposed in 1985, other researchers have proposed modified versions of the DF model that take additional factors into account, including observed covariates and opposite-sex DZ twins.

== Regression analysis ==
The probands are chosen with scores that fall below a "cutoff" for what is considered "extreme", and regression is then used to predict the co-twin scores based on those of the probands and a term reflecting whether the twin pair is MZ (1.0) or DZ (0.5). The formula used for DF regression is:

C = B_{1}P + B_{2}R + K

where C = expected co-twin score, P = proband score, R = coefficient of relationship (0.5 for DZ twins, 1.0 for MZ twins), and K = regression constant. B_{1} represents a measure of co-twin relatedness separate from that of zygosity, while B_{2} can be converted into an estimate of the heritability of extreme scores on the trait. By comparing MZ and DZ co-twins in this manner, an estimate of "group heritability" is generated.
