= John C. DeFries =

American geneticist

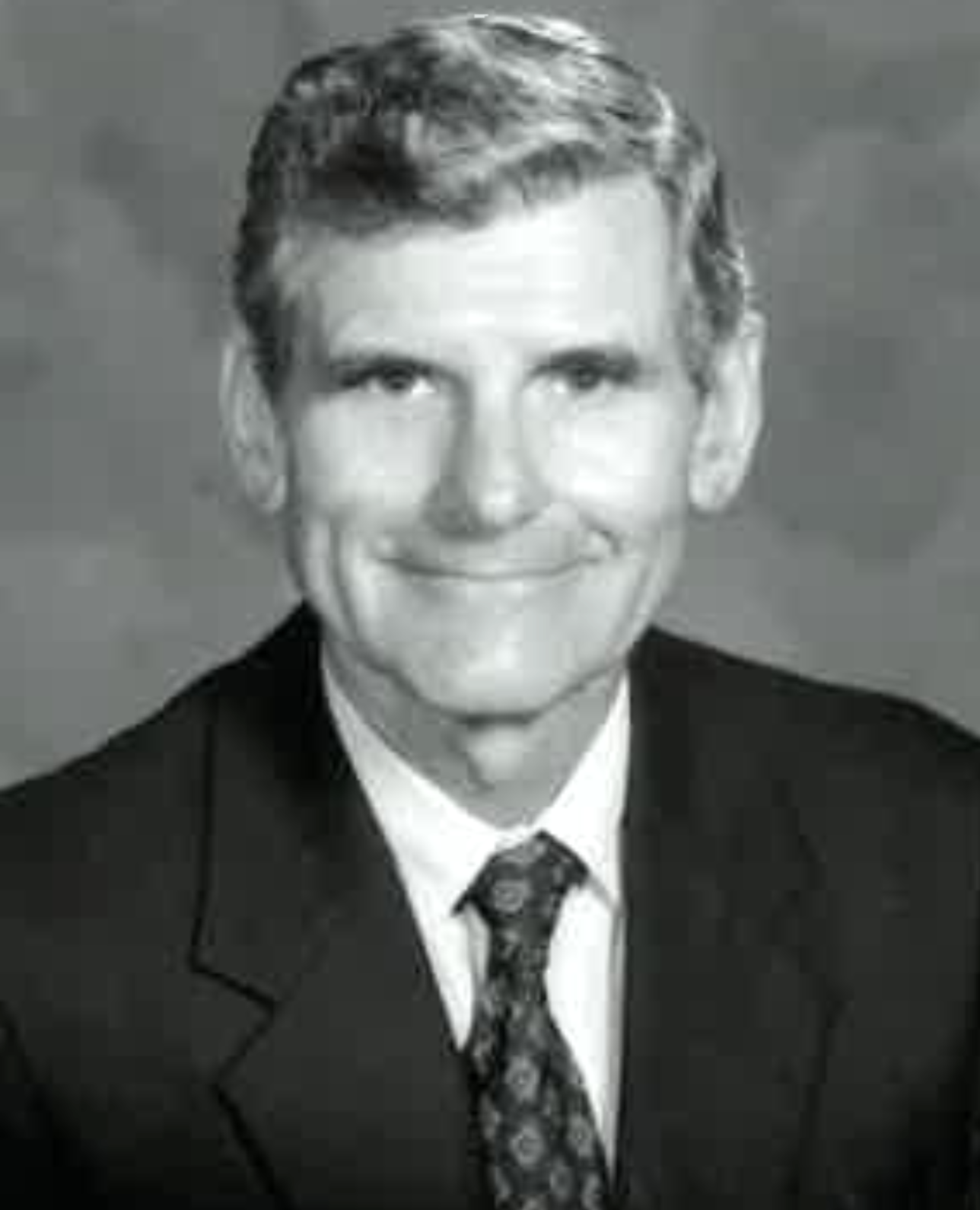
- Born: November 26, 1934 (age 91)
- Education: University of Illinois at Urbana–Champaign
- Scientific career
- Fields: Psychology; Behavior Genetics
- Workplaces: Institute for Behavioral Genetics

John C. DeFries (born November 26, 1934) is one of the world's leading behavior geneticists. His achievements include being President of the Behavior Genetics Association (1982–1983) and cofounder of the journal Behavior Genetics, as well as its co-editor (1970–1978). His awards include the Dobzhansky Award for Outstanding Research in Behavior Genetics (Behavior Genetics Association, 1992), Consulting Editor of the Journal of Learning Disabilities (1987–2002) and fellowships in the International Academy for Research in Learning Disabilities, Association for Psychological Science, and the American Association for the Advancement of Science, Section J (Psychology).

His contributions include major twin and adoption studies of cognitive abilities, genetics of learning disabilities, and, when molecular tools became available, pioneering the use of DNA markers to locate genes that influence behavioral characters.

At the Institute for Behavioral Genetics at the University of Colorado Boulder, DeFries established the world's first large twin study of dyslexia at the Institute for Behavior Genetics in Boulder, and supervised over 17 PhD students.

Among his works are a standard text on behavior genetics and original work on behavior-genetic methodology, some of it in collaboration with David Fulker.

DeFries' articles have been cited over 29,000 times and he has an h-index of 87.

== Selected books ==
- Behavioral Genetics in the Postgenomic Era, by Robert Plomin, John C. DeFries, Ian W. Craig, and Peter McGuffin
- Behavioral Genetics by Robert Plomin, John C. DeFries, Gerald E. McClearn and Peter McGuffin.
