= John Paul Scott (geneticist) =

American behavior geneticist

- Born: December 17, 1909; Kansas City, Missouri
- Died: March 26, 2000 (aged 90)
- Citizenship: United States
- Education: University of Chicago
- Known for: Research on social behavior, aggression, behavior genetics
- Awards: Rhodes Scholarship, Dobzhansky Award for Eminent Research
- Scientific career
- Fields: Behavior Genetics
- Workplaces: Bowling Green State University
- Doctoral advisor: Sewall Wright

John Paul Scott (December 17, 1909—March 26, 2000) was an American behavior geneticist and comparative psychologist known for his research into the development of social behavior (especially aggression), which he pursued through studies in animal models including the dog. Scott & his collaborator John L. Fuller are memorialised in the Fuller-Scott prize, offered annually by the Behavior Genetics Association.

== Education and career ==
He received a B.Sc. zoology from the University of Wyoming, studying under his father, John W. Scott. After taking out a Rhodes Scholarship at Oxford University under E. B. Ford, he completed a Ph.D. in Psychology from the University of Chicago, where he studied under renowned scholar of genetics and evolution, Sewall Wright.

Scott's first academic position was at Wabash College, where he chaired the department of Zoology from 1935 to 1945. As his sociobiological research developed, he moved to the Jackson Laboratory in Bar Harbor, Maine. Here he chaired the division of behavior studies, continuing to develop his comparative approach, combining animal behavior in the service of understanding and ameliorating human problems. Moving to Bowling Green State University, he took up a Regents Professorship in Psychology, and founded the Center for the Study of Social Behavior.

== Achievements ==
Scott's main published output lay in works on animal behavior, and, in particular, the behavior of dogs, crowned by his seminal "Genetics and the Social Behavior of the Dog".

He was a fellow of the AAAS, ABS, and APA, and was elected president of three societies (International Society for Developmental Psychobiology, Behavior Genetics Association, and the International Society for Research on Aggression). Scott was a co-founder of the International Society for Research on Aggression and the Animal Behavior Society. The Behavior Genetic Association awarded him its highest honour, the Dobzhansky Award for Eminent Research.

== Selected publications ==
- Scott, John Paul (1958). Animal Behavior (2nd edition 1975)
- Scott, John Paul (1958). Aggression (2nd Edition 1975)
- Scott, John Paul (1965). Genetics and the Social Behavior of the Dog.
