= Mental Rotations Test =

1978 test of spatial ability

The Mental Rotations Test is a test of spatial ability by Steven G. Vandenberg and Allan R. Kuse, first published in 1978. It has been used in hundreds of studies since then.

A meta-analysis of studies using this test showed that men performed better than women with no changes seen by birth cohort. A close analysis of subjects taking the test revealed that humans do not only rely on spatial imagery to solve the puzzles, but also involve more complex strategies.

== See also ==
- Mental rotation
