= Selective placement =

Phenomenon in adoption studies

In adoption studies, selective placement refers to the practice by which adoption agencies tend to deliberately match certain characteristics of an adopted child's adopted parents with those of the child's biological parents. This practice has important implications in adoption research as it can blur the distinction between genetic and environmental influences, making it more difficult to determine whether traits arise from nature or nurture.

== Methodological impact ==
When this selective placement occurs, it results in a correlation between environments between biological relatives being raised in different homes. It has the potential to bias the conclusions of such adoption studies; because, for example, twins who were reared in separate environments may in fact have been reared in much more similar environments than assumed if selective placement hadn't occurred. This can result in an inflated estimate of heritability.

Selective placement affects adoption studies, the primary aim of which is to disentangle the effects of genetics and environment and the fundamental assumption being that they are 'natural experiments'. The resulting resemblance from selective placement between child and adoptive parent may be incorrectly attributed to the environment, similarly, the resemblance between child and birth parents may be attributed solely to genetics, without accounting for environmental impacts. If unaccounted for, substantial biases can distort conclusions about the relative roles of genetic and environmental influences.

The impact of selective placement can differ between culture, time-periods or countries. Adoption systems are therefore not necessarily uniform, and can result in different degrees of matching and levels of record-keeping, making it difficult to generalise. The extent to which records are kept can also mean that the impacts of selective placement are difficult to measure. Some placements may be intentional with children being matched on every variable such as religion and social class, whereas, in others, placement may be more random or shaped by practicalities such as availability of adoptive families and legal restraints. Selective placement is therefore context-dependent, and the extent to which it is used reflects the level of bias introduced.

== Measuring and correcting for selective placement ==
Researchers identify the use of selective placement by considering the correlation coefficient between the traits of birth and adoptive parents. This informs the researcher about the extent to which a matching of characteristics such as socioeconomic levels, educational status and physical characteristics has occurred.

Selective placement should be accounted for in statistical analysis to arrive at accurate heritability estimates. Researchers can achieve this by including measures of the adoptive parents' traits as covariates when predicting the extent of genetic influences. More advanced methods such as path analysis models derived from Van Eerdewegh (1982) allows researchers to separate the various sources of resemblance, reducing bias in estimates of genetic and environmental influences.

== Issues in older studies ==
There is evidence that selective placement featured in older studies which primarily focused "on the birth-mother" when matching characteristics. Details about the adopted infant such as gestational age and early health status were not taken into account. These studies placed significant emphasis on education or occupation as the variables to match adoptive parents on. This information was obtained solely from the birth parents, creating a flaw as the majority of birth parents in the studies were young and therefore in a dynamic state of "educational and occupational status", inevitably meaning that their eventual "socioeconomic status" may differ notably from their status at the time of the adoption. To address this, it could have been beneficial to also take into account the status of the birth parents' own parents or carers.

There is evidence, as illustrated in Farber's book 'Identical Twins Reared Apart: A Reanalysis' that selective placement was a major confound in many early studies of twins reared apart.

== Evidence for and against selective placement ==
Some adoption studies report little or no evidence of selective placement. In the 'Early Growth and Development Study', Leve et al. (2019) correlated birth and adoptive parent characteristics, specifically focusing on "traits" unlikely to be influenced by evocative gene-environment correlations, such as "self-worth" and "executive function." The study found that of "132 comparisons", "only 3 were statistically significant at p<0.05." For example, This is broadly consistent with a 1979 study by Ho et al. examining selective placement directly. It was reported that a generally low level of selective placement in adopted children for either physical or behavioural traits took place The authors concluded that to the extent that selective placement occurred for such traits, "our data suggest that it is based largely on characteristics of the birth father," rather than those of the adoptee. consistent with Carey (2003) who concluded that selective placement was "moderate" for physical characteristics and typically "small or nonexistent" for behavioural characteristics. Together, these findings suggest that while selective placement does occur, its extent varies by trait.

In contrast, some earlier studies did employ selective placement to a greater degree. For instance, Cadoret's 1995 'Adoption Studies' article recognises that certain studies matched on "hair and eye colour"; additionally, agencies may guide placement decisions on a child's future potential by observing the traits of their biological parents, particularly "education or socioeconomic level" and using them as indicators of the child's trajectory.

== Selective placement of different traits ==
Cognitive

In Freeman et al.'s 1928 study, selective placement on cognitive abilities e.g. IQ occurred using the Stanford-Binet IQ scores for the adopted-away children prior to placement. This is despite limited available cognitive data from birth parents, except if they had a 'mental defect' or 'moral defect'. In cases where the children were old enough for these scores to be meaningful (40% were above 4 years old), the information may have influenced adoption decisions.

Physical

Other studies suggest selective placements were not restricted to cognitive characteristics, but also physical characteristics, specifically, "hair and eye colour". This could have possible evolutionary explanations, such as the debated "paternal resemblance hypothesis". Herring acknowledges this hypothesis which states that adult men are predisposed to subconsciously care for children whom they look similar to as it assures them of their paternity.

Behavioural

Selective placements on behavioural characteristics include "educational level and occupation" that used not only the birth parents' data but also recorded the child's grandparents' characteristics. The average correlations for comparisons between birth and adoptive parents were "0.19 for education and 0.13 for occupation". This highlights that whilst the correlation coefficients are not significant, the behavioural patterns of the birth parents are used in selective placement.

== Limitations ==
However, the above findings should be interpreted cautiously as studies involving selective placements can be of limited reliability due to the quality of records available to research the traits of birth parents. For instance, in early adoption studies, researchers had to rely on incomplete agency files and recorded correlations between adoptive and birth parents. Also, due to confidentiality, attaining data from a wide range of sources about the birth parents can pose a legal difficulty. For these reasons, it can be difficult to understand the extent to which selective placement has been used in many cases.

It is also not possible to establish with certainty a causal link between adopted and biological families based solely on selective placement. This is due to the range of overlapping processes that can lead to resemblance between adopted and biological families, for instance, shared social backgrounds and pre-adoption experiences. Therefore, selective placement should be considered as one of several potential sources of bias, rather than a sole explanation.
