= Liddy Nevile =

Australian academic, computer education pioneer

- Born: 1947 (age 78–79); Melbourne, Australia
- Education: RMIT University (PhD)
- Known for: Laptops in schools and Web adaptability research.
- Notable work: From Web accessibility to Web adaptability; IMS Access For All Meta-data - Information Model; Let's Talk Turtle.
- Website: www.sunriseresearch.org

Elizabeth "Liddy" Nevile (born 1947) is an Australian academic and a pioneer in using computers and the World Wide Web for education in Australia. In 1989-1990 she was instrumental in establishing the first program in the world that required all students to have laptop computers, at Methodist Ladies College, Melbourne, Australia.

== Education ==
- BJuris/LLB (Monash University) with a major in Pure Mathematics.
- MEd (RMIT University).
- PhD (RMIT University).

== Career ==
=== Laptops in schools ===
In the early 1980s, Nevile worked with primary school students (including her own children) using the Logo programming language and Turtle educational robots. In 1984 she wrote Let's Talk Turtle with Carolyn Dowling. This provided a curriculum for teaching programming in the classroom with Logo and Turtles. In 1988, while working for the Australian Council for Educational Research (1986-1990), she launched the Sunrise Schools project. This project drew upon the constructivist theory of knowing of Jean Piaget, and the constructionism theory of learning as instantiated in the Logo programming language of Seymour Papert. Nevile organised for the first Sunrise classroom to be held in the Melbourne Museum.

During this period, Nevile and Dowling visited international educational research groups, including Massachusetts Institute of Technology. This allowed them to create links with significant researchers including Papert, Hal Abelson, Andy diSessa, Brian Silverman and Steve Ocko.

In 1989, with the support of principal David Loader, Nevile worked with the Methodist Ladies College to establish a trial with a Year 7 Sunrise class "...which was considered immensely successful." This was followed in 1990 with all Year 5 students required to own a laptop. For the school, "...the laptop introduction process effected an environment of radical change and radical rethinking of the role of both teacher and learner." These were the world's first classes where every child had their own computer.

In 1990 the program was adopted by the Queensland Department of Education for implementation in Coombahbah, Queensland. It began with two Year 6 groups - one group of thirty having continual access to the laptop and the other group sharing one to two. In 1991 the program was extended to include Year 7 as well.

=== World Wide Web and adaptability ===
In 1990, Nevile established the Sunrise Research Laboratory at RMIT University (1990-1999). The program adopted John Mason's ‘discipline of noticing’ to anticipate and understand the impact of ubiquitous computing on academic life.

As the World Wide Web developed, Nevile worked on incorporating it into her work with teachers and schools. From 1996, Sunrise Research Laboratory produced the OZeKIDS series of CD-ROM, providing Australian schools with tutorials on coding HTML and examples of websites such as the National Library of Australia.

From 1996, Nevile was instrumental in developing the case for opening a branch office of the World Wide Web Consortium in Australia. The office opened in 2000.

On 22 September 1998, Nevile organised a workshop on Web accessibility to support the Web Accessibility Initiative, launched in 1997. This developed into the OZeWAI conference, which shared information about Web content adaptability in Australia. It brings together technology professionals, content publishers, industry representatives and people with disabilities to develop ways of making digital resources more widely accessible.

Her research has focused on the use of metadata to facilitate access to Web resources that are adapted to user requirements.

She worked with Sophie Lissonnet and the elders responsible for Quinkan culture in north eastern Australia to develop a Qualified Dublin Core catalogue to identify and record examples of Quinkan Culture. It was designed to allow Elders to manage the proliferation of unauthorised publications about Quinkan culture, and to repatriate cultural representations.

In 2004, she developed the IMS Learning Design AccessForAll Meta-data Information Model with David Weinkauf, Anthony Roberts, Madeleine Rothberg, Jutta Treviranus, Anastasia Cheetham, Martyn Cooper, Andrew C. Heath, and Alex Jackl. This standard describes a method for providing functional interoperability to support the substitution or augmentation of one resource with another when this is required for accessibility purposes, as prescribed in the user's AccessForAll profile.

In 2005, she presented Anonymous Dublin Core profiles for accessible user relationships with resources and services. It presents the case for an anonymous personal profile of accessibility needs and preferences which could be expressed in a Dublin Core format. This profile encodes personal needs and preferences, without reference to disabilities, in a common vocabulary to be matched by resource and service capabilities.

In 2006, with Jutta Treviranus, she published Interoperability for Individual Learner Centred Accessibility for Web-based Educational Systems, a description of the AccessForAll standard. It provides an inclusive framework for educational accommodation that supports accessibility, mobility, cultural, language and location appropriateness and increases educational flexibility.

In 2009, she published From Web accessibility to Web adaptability with Brian Kelly, David Sloan, Sotiris Fanou, Ruth Ellison and Lisa Marie Herrod. This article calls for a shift from the author's determination of the anticipated users' needs (accessibility) to users facilitating individual accessibility in the open Web environment (adaptability).

In 2009, Nevile completed her PhD at RMIT University on Metadata for user-centred, inclusive access to digital resources: realising the theory of AccessForAll Accessibility.

== Significant publications ==
- Nevile, Liddy, and Carolyn Dowling. Let's Talk Apple Turtle. Prentice-Hall of Australia, 1984.
- Nevile, Liddy. Evaluation of uses of computers in education : report of a Unesco Regional Seminar, Melbourne, 24–29 May 1987.
- Nevile, Liddy, and Sophie Lissonnet. "Dublin Core: The Base for an Indigenous Culture Environment?." Museums and the Web (2003).
- Nevile, Liddy, and Sophie Lissonnet. "Dublin core and museum information: metadata as cultural heritage data." International Journal of Metadata, Semantics and Ontologies1.3 (2006): 198–206.
- Weinkauf, David, Liddy Nevile, Anthony Roberts, Madeleine Rothberg, Jutta Treviranus, Anastasia Cheetham, Martyn Cooper, Andrew C. Heath, Alex Jackl. “IMS AccessForAll Meta-data.” (2004).
- Nevile, Liddy. "Anonymous Dublin Core Profiles for Accessible User Relationships with Resources and Services." Data Analysis and Knowledge Discovery 22.1 (2006): 17–24.
- Nevile, Liddy and Jutta Treviranus. “Interoperability for Individual Learner Centred Accessibility for Web-based Educational Systems.” Journal of Educational Technology and Society 9 (2006): 215–227.
- Kelly, Brian, Liddy Nevile, David Sloan, Sotiris Fanou, Ruth Ellison, and Lisa Herrod. "From web accessibility to web adaptability." Disability and Rehabilitation: Assistive Technology 4, no. 4 (2009): 212–226.
