= Martin L. Lalumière =

Canadian Psychologist

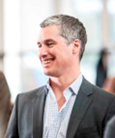
- Education: Université de Montréal (B.Sc., 1989; M.Ps., 1990), Queen's University at Kingston (Ph.D., 1995)
- Known for: Research on sex offending and paraphilias
- Scientific career
- Fields: Forensic Psychology
- Workplaces: University of Ottawa
- Website: https://uniweb.uottawa.ca/network/profile/members/940

Martin L. Lalumière is a Canadian forensic psychologist, sexologist, and a full professor at the School of Psychology at the University of Ottawa. He is known for his work on the etiology of sexual offending, sexual aggression, as well as the assessment of sexual attraction to children.

== Education ==
Lalumière was born in Montréal, Quebec. He earned his B.Sc. (1989) and M.A. in psychology from Université de Montréal, and his Ph.D. (1995) in psychology from Queen's University at Kingston.

== Career ==
From 1996 to 1997, Lalumière began his career as a research psychologist at the maximum-security unit of the Mental Health Centre Pentanguishene, a psychiatric hospital located on Georgian Bay, Ontario (later the Waypoint Centre for Mental Health Care).

From 1997 to 2004, Lalumière worked as a research psychologist in the Law and Mental Health Program at the Centre for Addiction and Mental Health (CAMH) in Toronto, Canada. Lalumière was also a faculty member in the Department of Psychiatry and the Centre for Criminology and Sociolegal Studies at University of Toronto.

After leaving his position at the University, Lalumière joined the Department of Psychology at the University of Lethbridge, Alberta from 2004 to 2012. He joined the School of Psychology at University of Ottawa in 2013.

Lalumière served as the Vice-Dean of Governance and Internationalization for the Faculty of Social Sciences at the University of Ottawa.

== Research ==
Lalumière is recognized for his work on topics related to paraphilias and sexual aggression. His most widely cited study identified factors that distinguish—and that do not distinguish—male adolescents who have committed sexual offenses from male adolescents who have committed non-sexual offenses.

With Michael C. Seto, Lalumière co-developed the Screening Scale for Pedophilic Interests (SSPI, and its revised version, the SSPI-2), a structured method for screening for pedophilic interests based on offending behavior. The SSPI/SSPI-2 was adopted as a stand-alone assessment instrument in many countries.

== Editorial work ==
Lalumière was an associate editor for Archives of Sexual Behavior and served on editorial boards for journals including Aggressive Behavior, Canadian Journal of Human Sexuality, Evolutionary Psychology, and Sexual Abuse.
