= Robin Corley =

American behavior geneticist

- Born: Robin Paul Corley
- Education: University of Colorado Boulder
- Scientific career
- Fields: Behavioral genetics
- Workplaces: University of Colorado Boulder
- Thesis: Genetic and environmental continuity among measures of general cognitive ability in infancy, early childhood, and adulthood using combined parent—offspring and sibling data from the Colorado Adoption Project (1987)

Robin Paul Corley is an American behavior geneticist and senior research associate at the Institute for Behavioral Genetics at the University of Colorado Boulder.

He studied twins to learn about how cognitive ability and executive function are inherited.
