= Mental rotation =

Rotation of an object in the mind

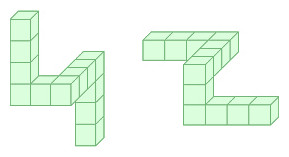
Example problem based on Shepard & Metzler's "Mental Rotation Task": are these two three-dimensional shapes identical when rotated?

Mental rotation is the ability to rotate mental representations of two-dimensional and three-dimensional objects as it is related to the visual representation of such rotation within the human mind. There is a relationship between areas of the brain associated with perception and mental rotation. There could also be a relationship between the cognitive rate of spatial processing, general intelligence and mental rotation.

Mental rotation can be described as the brain moving objects in order to help understand what they are and where they belong. Mental rotation has been studied to try to figure out how the mind recognizes objects in their environment. Researchers generally call such objects stimuli. Mental rotation is one cognitive function for the person to figure out what the altered object is.

Mental rotation can be separated into the following cognitive stages:

1. Create a mental image of an object from all directions (imagining where it continues straight vs. turns).
2. Rotate the object mentally until a comparison can be made (orientating the stimulus to other figure).
3. Make the comparison.
4. Decide if the objects are the same or not.
5. Report the decision (reaction time is recorded when a lever is pulled or a button is pressed).

== Assessment ==
Originally developed in 1978 by Vandenberg and Kuse based on the research by Shepard and Metzler (1971), a Mental Rotation Test (MRT) consists of a participant comparing two 3D objects (or letters), often rotated in some axis, and states if they are the same image or if they are mirror images (enantiomorphs). Commonly, the test will have pairs of images each rotated a specific number of degrees (e.g. 0°, 60°, 120° or 180°). A set number of pairs will be split between being the same image rotated, while others are mirrored. The researcher judges the participant on how accurately and rapidly they can distinguish between the mirrored and non-mirrored pairs.

== Notable research ==
=== Shepard and Metzler (1971) ===
Roger Shepard and Jacqueline Metzler (1971) were some of the first to research the phenomenon. Their experiment specifically tested mental rotation on three-dimensional objects. Each subject was presented with multiple pairs of three-dimensional, asymmetrical lined or cubed objects. The experiment was designed to measure how long it would take each subject to determine whether the pair of objects were indeed the same object or two different objects. Their research showed that the reaction time for participants to decide if the pair of items matched or not was linearly proportional to the angle of rotation from the original position. That is, the more an object has been rotated from the original, the longer it takes an individual to determine if the two images are of the same object or enantiomorphs.

=== Vandenberg and Kuse (1978) ===
In 1978, Steven G. Vandenberg and Allan R. Kuse developed the Mental Rotations Test (MRT) to assess mental rotation abilities that was based on Shepard and Metzler's (1971) original study. The Mental Rotations Test was constructed using India ink drawings. Each stimulus was a two-dimensional image of a three-dimensional object drawn by a computer. The image was then displayed on an oscilloscope. Each image was then shown at different orientations rotated around the vertical axis. The original test contained 20 items, demanding the comparison of four figures with a criterion figure, with two of them being correct. Following the basic ideas of Shepard and Metzler's experiment, this study found a significant difference in the mental rotation scores between men and women, with men performing better. Correlations with other measures showed strong association with tests of spatial visualization and no association with verbal ability.

== Neuropsychology ==
In 2000, a study was conducted to find out which part of the brain is activated during mental rotation. Seven volunteers (four males and three females) between the ages of twenty-nine to sixty-six participated in this experiment. For the study, the subjects were shown eight characters 4 times each (twice in normal orientation and twice reversed) and the subjects had to decide if the character was in its normal configuration or if it was the mirror image. During this task, a PET scan was performed and revealed activation in the right posterior parietal lobe.

Functional magnetic resonance imaging (fMRI) studies of brain activation during mental rotation reveal consistent increased activation of the parietal lobe, specifically the inter-parietal sulcus, that is dependent on the difficulty of the task. In general, the larger the angle of rotation, the more brain activity associated with the task. This increased brain activation is accompanied by longer times to complete the rotation task and higher error rates. Researchers have argued that the increased brain activation, increased time, and increased error rates indicate that task difficulty is proportional to the angle of rotation.

A 2006 study observed the following brain areas to be activated during mental rotation as compared to baseline: bilateral medial temporal gyrus, left medial occipital gyrus, bilateral superior occipital gyrus, bilateral superior parietal lobe, and left inferior occipital gyrus during the rotation task.

== Development ==
Gloria Marmor was the first to study mental rotation abilities in children. These and a number of subsequent studies suggested that children can solve mental rotation task that require a forced choice by the age of about 3.5 to 5 years, although at a slower speed than adults, and that mental rotation performance is linked to motor activity. In contrast, research measuring infants' looking times has shown that they can already track and anticipate the orientation of objects in the first year of life, and discriminate mirrored objects that differ in orientation.

A study from 2008 further suggested that sex differences may occur early during development. The experiment was done on 3- to 4-month-old infants using a 2D mental rotation task. They used a preference apparatus that consists of observing during how much time the infant is looking at the stimulus. They started by familiarizing the participants with the number "1" and its rotations. Then they showed them a picture of a "1" rotated and its mirror image. It appears that gendered differences may appear early in development, as the study showed that males are more responsive to the mirror image. According to the study, this may mean that males and females process mental rotation differently even as infants. However, other infant studies did not find any sex differences. Supporting the presence of sex differences early in development, other studies have found that gendered differences in mental rotation tests were visible in all age groups, including young children. Interestingly, these differences emerged much later for other categories of spatial tests.

In 2020, Advances in Child Development and Behavior published a review that examined mental rotation abilities during very early development. The authors concluded that an ability to mentally rotate objects can be detected in infants as young as 3 months of age. Also, MR processes in infancy likely remain stable over time into adulthood. Additional variables that appeared to influence infants' MR performance include motor activity, stimulus complexity, hormone levels, and parental attitudes

== Factors that affect performance ==
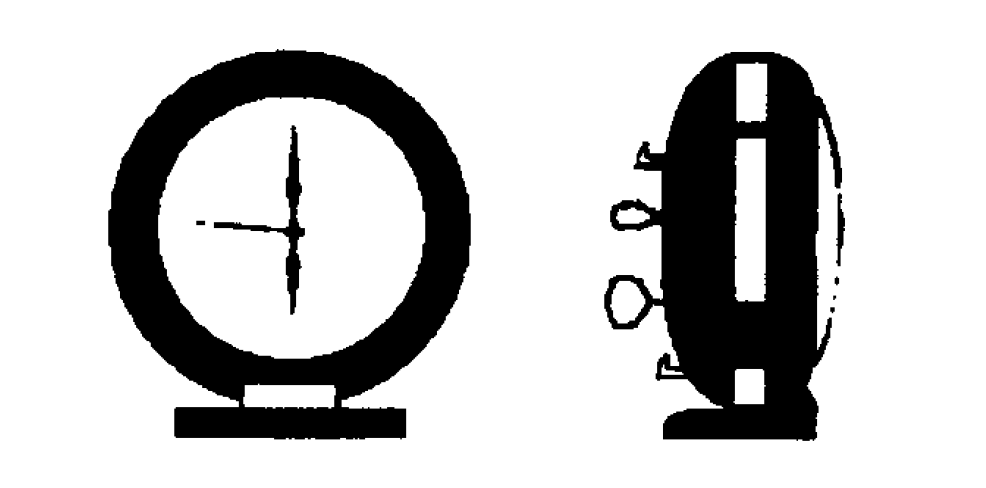
Rotation in depth 90 degrees

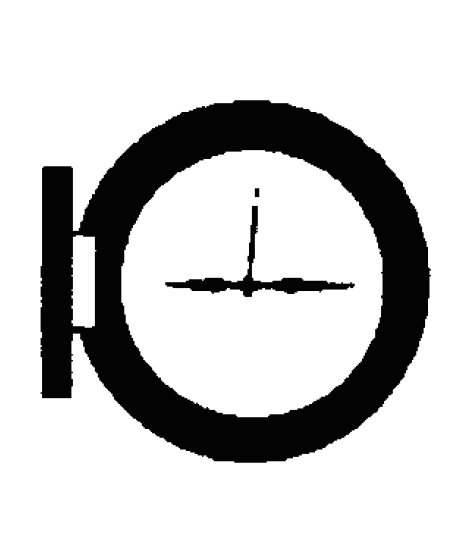
Rotation in the picture plane 90 degrees

=== Color ===
Physical objects that people imagine rotating in everyday life have many properties, such as textures, shapes, and colors. A study at the University of California Santa Barbara was conducted to specifically test the extent to which visual information, such as color, is represented during mental rotation. This study used several methods such as reaction time studies, verbal protocol analysis, and eye tracking. In the initial reaction time experiments, those with poor rotational ability were affected by the colors of the image, whereas those with good rotational ability were not. Overall, those with poor ability were faster and more accurate identifying images that were consistently colored. The verbal protocol analysis showed that the subjects with low spatial ability mentioned color in their mental rotation tasks more often than participants with high spatial ability. One thing that can be shown through this experiment is that those with higher rotational ability will be less likely to represent color in their mental rotation. Poor rotators will be more likely to represent color in their mental rotation using piecemeal strategies (Khooshabeh & Hegarty, 2008).

=== Athletic, musical, and artistic skills ===
Research on how athleticism and artistic ability affect mental rotation has been conducted. Pietsch, S., & Jansen, P. (2012) showed that people who were athletes or musicians had faster reaction times than people who were not. They tested this by splitting people from the age of 18 and higher into three groups. The groups consisted of music students, sports students, and education students. It was found that students who were focused on sports or music did much better than those who were education majors. Also, it was found that the male athletes and education majors in the experiment were faster than the respective females, but male and female musicians showed no significant difference in reaction time.

A 2007 study supported the results that musicians perform better on mental rotation tasks than non-musicians. In particular, orchestral musicians' MRT task performance exhibited aptitude levels significantly higher than the population baseline.

Moreau, D., Clerc, et al. (2012) also investigated if athletes were more spatially aware than non-athletes. This experiment took undergraduate college students and tested them with the mental rotation test before any sport training, and then again afterward. The participants were trained in two different sports to see if this would help their spatial awareness. It was found that the participants did better on the mental rotation test after they had trained in the sports, than they did before the training. This experiment brought to the research that if people could find ways to train their mental rotation skills they could perform better in high context activities with greater ease.

Researchers studied the difference in mental rotation ability between gymnasts, handball, and soccer players with both in-depth and in-plane rotations. Results suggested that athletes were better at performing mental rotation tasks that were more closely related to their sport of expertise.

There is a correlation in mental rotation and motor ability in children, and this connection is especially strong in boys ages 7–8. The study showed that there is considerable overlap between spatial reasoning and athletic ability, even among young children.

A mental rotation test (MRT) was carried out on gymnasts, orienteers, runners, and non athletes. Results showed that non athletes were greatly outperformed by gymnasts and orienteers, but not runners. Gymnasts (egocentric athletes) did not outperform orienteers (allocentric athletes). Egocentric indicates understanding the position of your body as it relates to objects in space, and allocentric indicates understanding the relation of multiple objects in space independently of the self-perspective.

A study investigated the effect of mental rotation on postural stability. Participants performed a MR (mental rotation) task involving either foot stimuli, hand stimuli, or non-body stimuli (a car) and then had to balance on one foot. The results suggested that MR tasks involving foot stimuli were more effective at improving balance than hand or car stimuli, even after 60 minutes.

Contrary to what one might expect, previous studies examining whether artists are superior at mental rotation have been mixed, and a recent study substantiates the null findings. It has been theorized that artists are adept at recognizing, creating, and activating visual stimuli, but not necessarily at manipulating them.

A 2018 study examined the effect of studying various subjects within higher education on mental rotation ability. The researchers found that architecture students performed significantly better than art students, who performed significantly better than both psychology and business majors, with gender and other demographic differences accounted for. These findings make sense intuitively, given that architecture students are highly acquainted with manipulating the orientation of structures in space.

=== Sex ===
Following the Vandenberg and Kuse study, subsequent research attempted to assess the presence of gendered differences in mental rotation ability. For the first couple of decades immediately following the research, the topic was addressed in different meta-analyses with inconclusive results. However, Voyer et al. conducted a comprehensive review in 1995, which showed that gender differences were reliable and more pronounced in specific tasks, indicating that sex affects the processes underlying performance in spatial memory tests. Analogous to other types of spatial reasoning tasks, men tended to outperform women by a statistically significant margin among the MR literature.

As mentioned above, many studies have shown that there is a difference between male and female performance in mental rotation tasks. To learn more about this difference, brain activation during a mental rotation task was studied. In 2012, a study was done in which males and females were asked to execute a mental rotation task, and their brain activity was recorded with an fMRI. The researchers found a difference of brain activation: males presented a stronger activity in the area of the brain used in a mental rotation task.

Furthermore, sex-related differences in mental rotation abilities may reflect evolutionary differences. Men assumed the role of hunting and foraging, which necessitates a greater degree of visual-spatial processing than the child-rearing and domestic tasks which women performed. Biologically, males receive higher fetal exposure to androgens than females, and retain these relatively higher levels for life. This difference plays a significant role in human sexual dimorphism, and may be a causal factor in the differences observed regarding mental rotation. Interestingly, women with congenital adrenal hyperplasia (CAH), who are exposed to higher levels of fetal androgen than control women, tend to perform better on the MRT than women with normal amounts of fetal androgen exposure. Additionally, the significant role of hormonal variation between the sexes was supported by a 2004 study, which revealed that testosterone (a principal androgen) level in young men was negatively correlated with the number of errors and response time in the MRT. Therefore, higher levels of testosterone probably contribute to better performance.

Another study from 2015 was focused on women and their abilities in a mental rotation task and an emotion recognition task. In this experiment they induced a feeling or a situation in which women feel more powerful or less powerful. They were able to conclude that women in a situation of power are better in a mental rotation task (but less performant in an emotion recognition task) than other women. Interestingly, the types of cognitive strategies that men and women typically employ may be a contributing factor. The literature has established that men generally prefer holistic strategies, whereas women prefer analytic-verbal strategies and focus on specific parts of the whole puzzle. Women tended to act more conservatively as well, sacrificing time to double-check the incorrect items more often than men. Consequently, women require more time to execute their technique when completing tasks like the MRT. In order to determine the extent of this variable's significance, Hirnstein et al. (2009) created a modified MRT in which the number of matching figures could vary between zero and four, which, compared to the original MRT, favored the strategy most often employed by women. The research found that gender differences declined somewhat, but men still outperformed women.

Along the same lines, a 2021 study found intriguing results in an attempt to discern the mechanisms behind the established gender disparity. The researchers hypothesized that task characteristics, not only anatomical or social differences, could explain men's advantage in mental rotation. In particular, the objects to be rotated were changed from the typical geometric or spherical shapes to male or female stereotyped objects, such as a tractor and a stroller, respectively. The results revealed significant gender differences only when male-stereotyped objects were used as rotational material. When female-stereotyped rotational material was used, men and women performed equally. This finding may explain underlying causes behind the usual disparate outcomes, in that the male ability to do somewhat better on MRT tests probably stems from the evolutionary applicability of spatial reasoning. Objects that aren't relevant to historical male gender roles, and are consequently generally unfamiliar to men, are much more difficult for men to conceptualize spatially than more familiar shapes. Likewise, other recent studies suggest that difference between Mental rotation cognition task are a consequence of procedure and artificiality of the stimuli. A 2017 study leveraged photographs and three-dimensional models, evaluating multiple approaches and stimuli. Results show that changing the stimuli can eliminate any male advantages found from the Vandenberg and Kuse test (1978).

Studying differences between male and female brains can have interesting applications. For example, it could help in the understanding of the autism spectrum disorders. One of the theories concerning autism is the EMB (extreme male brain). This theory considers autistic people to have an "extreme male brain". In a study from 2015, researchers confirmed that there is a difference between male and female in mental rotation task (by studying people without autism): males are more successful. Then they highlighted the fact that autistic people do not have this "male performance" in a mental rotation task. They conclude their study by "autistic people do not have an extreme version of a male cognitive profile as proposed by the EMB theory".

== Current and future research directions ==
Much of the current and future research directions pertain to expanding on what has been established by the literature and investigating underlying causes behind previous results. Future studies will consider additional factors that could influence MR ability, including demographics, various aptitudes, personality, rare/deviant psychological profiles, among others. Many current and future studies are and will be examining the ways that certain brain abnormalities, including many of those caused by traumatic injuries, affect one's ability to perform mental rotation. There is some evidence that what appears to be mental rotation in depth is actually a response to the properties of flat pictures.

There may be relationships between competent bodily movement and the speed with which individuals can perform mental rotation. Researchers found children who trained with mental rotation tasks had improved strategy skills after practicing. People use many different strategies to complete tasks; psychologists will study participants who use specific cognitive skills to compare competency and reaction times. Others will continue to examine the differences in competency of mental rotation based on the objects being rotated. Participants' identification with the object could hinder or help their mental rotation abilities across gender and ages to support the earlier claim that males have faster reaction times. Psychologists will continue to test similarities between mental rotation and physical rotation, examining the difference in reaction times and relevance to environmental implications.

== See also ==
- Mental event
- Space mapping
