= Frank Faulkner =

Frank Faulkner may refer to:

- Frank Faulkner, pseudonym of Edward S. Ellis (1840–1916), American author
- Frank Faulkner, Perry Mason character played by Robert Bice
- Frankie Faulkner, character in Alias Nick Beal

== See also ==
- Frank Falconer (1883–1970), politician from Alberta, Canada
- Frank Falkner (1918–2003), British-born American biologist and pediatrician
- Francis Faulkner (disambiguation)
