= Lindon Eaves =

Behavioral scientist (1944–2022)

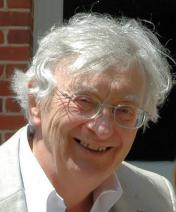
- Born: 23 September 1944; Walsall, Staffordshire, England
- Died: 8 March 2022 (aged 77); Richmond, Virginia, U.S.
- Education: University of Birmingham, Ripon College Cuddesdon, Oxford University
- Known for: Development of field of behavioral genetics, statistical modeling, genetical theory, genetics of personality and social attitudes
- Scientific career
- Fields: Behavioural genetics
- Workplaces: Virginia Commonwealth University, University of Birmingham, Oxford University
- Doctoral advisor: John L. Jinks
- Doctoral students: Andrew C. Heath, Nick Martin

Lindon J. Eaves (1944–2022) was a behavior geneticist and priest who published on topics as diverse as the heritability of religion and psychopathology. His research encompassed the development of mathematical models reflecting competing theories of the causes and familial transmission of human human differences, the design of studies for the resolution, analytical methods for parameter estimation and hypothesis-testing and application to substantive questions about specific (human) traits. He was the first to consider standardized variance components for heritability estimates and was the first (at least in the human context) to consider the effects of living with a relative (with a different genotype or, in the case of monozygotic twins, the same genotype) on the behavior of a person. Furthermore, he was the first to think about genotype x age interaction and set up the algebra to study the effects of genes working in males as well as females, making it possible to use twins pairs of opposite-sex (dizygotic opposite sex). Together with Nick Martin, he wrote many classic papers, one of which is "The genetic analysis of covariance structure". They also wrote the book, Genes, culture and personality: An empirical approach. In 2012, a Festschrift was held in Edinburgh dedicated to Eaves' work; the proceedings were subsequently published in Behavior Genetics.

He was ordained a deacon in 1968, and a priest in 1969 by the Bishop of Birmingham, Church of England. He served in the Church of England until 1981 and several churches in Richmond, Virginia including Church of the Holy Comforter, 1986–1997; St. James's, 1997; and St. Thomas, 2002–2013 as a priest in residence.

== Early life ==
Eaves studied genetics at the University of Birmingham and theology at Ripon College Cuddesdon. He was professor in the Department of Psychology at the University of Oxford until 1981, when he moved to Virginia Commonwealth University where Walter Nance and Linda Corey had established the Virginia Twin Registry. In 1996, he and Kenneth Kendler founded the Virginia Institute for Psychiatric and Behavioral Genetics, where he was professor emeritus and actively engaged in research and training.

== Honors ==
- 1966: First class honors in Genetics, University of Birmingham
- 1981: James Shields Award for Twin Research
- 1989: Mead-Swing Lecturer, Oberlin College
- 1991: President, Behavior Genetics Association
- 1993: Paul Hoch Award, American Psychopathological Association
- 1993-1995: President, International Society for Study of Twins
- 1996: McNair Lecturer, University of North Carolina at Chapel Hill
- 1999: Dobzhansky Award, Behavioral Genetics Association
- 1999: Nobel Lecturer, Gustavus Adolphus College, Saint Peter, MN 'Genetics in the New Millennium'
- 2000: Doctor Honoris Causa, VU University, Amsterdam, Netherlands
- 2000: Root Lecturer, Washing & Lee University, Lexington, VA
- 2001: VCU School of Medicine Outstanding Research Achievement Award
- 2001: VCU Distinguished Scholarship Award
- 2001: VCU School of Medicine Outstanding Departmental Teacher Award
