= Nicholas G. Martin =

Australian behavior geneticist (born 1950)

Nicholas Gordon Martin
- Born: 14 February 1950 (age 76); Adelaide, Australia
- Citizenship: Australian
- Education: University of Adelaide, University of Birmingham
- Known for: Application of SEM to Behavioral Genetics; Molecular genetics; Genetics of values
- Scientific career
- Fields: Behavioural genetics
- Workplaces: QIMR Berghofer
- Thesis: The classical twin study in human behaviour genetics (1977)
- Doctoral advisor: Lindon Eaves

Nicholas Gordon Martin (born 14 February 1950) is an Australian behaviour geneticist and director of the Genetic Epidemiology Laboratory at the QIMR Berghofer Medical Research Institute. He has taught in the Departments of Medicine, Pathology, Zoology, and Psychology at the University of Queensland. He has received several awards and distinction for his work in genetics and twin studies.

== Academic career ==
Martin studied at the University of Adelaide where he completed his undergraduate degree in 1972. In the same year, he established a sample of twins in Adelaide while completing his honours thesis.

Martin moved to the United Kingdom to complete a PhD in 1977 under Lindon Eaves at the University of Birmingham. After working as a research fellow at the Department of Genetics of the University of Birmingham (1976–1978) and at the Department of Population Biology, Research School of Biological Sciences, Australian National University (1978–1983), he took a post as an Assistant Professor in the Department of Human Genetics at the Medical College of Virginia (1983–1986). He returned to Australia in 1986, moving to Brisbane, where he currently directs the Genetic Epidemiology Laboratory at the QIMR Berghofer Medical Research Institute (QIMR Berghofer). Since 1992, he has been an adjunct Professor in the Departments of Pathology (1993), Zoology (1996), and Psychology (2003) at the University of Queensland, and Senior Principal Research Fellow at the QIMR Berghofer Medical Research Institute. In 1978, together with J.D. Mathews, he established the Australian Twin Registry. QIMR Berghofer is now home to one of the largest twin studies in the world, with more than 30 000 pairs enrolled. Martin has also "recruited over 3000 anorexia cases and over 20,000 depression cases. New projects are planned for stuttering and bipolar."

== Research ==
Martin's 1977 thesis, The Classical Twin Study in Human Behaviour Genetics, led, in part, to his co-authored publication, The power of the classical twin study (1978).

According to the Queensland Brain Institute, Martin has published more than 1200 research papers.

== Honours ==
Martin has twice won the Behavior Genetics Association's Editors’ Choice Award (previously known as the Fulker Award) for best paper in Behavior Genetics (1999 & 2003), the Dobzhansky Founders Lifetime Achievement Award, given for outstanding lifetime contributions to the field of behavior genetics (2005), and the James Shields Award of the International Society of Twin Studies for outstanding contributions to twin research (1986).

He was elected a Fellow of the Australian Academy of the Social Sciences in 2003, Australian Academy of Science in 2008, and the Australian Academy of Health and Medical Sciences (FAHMS) in 2015.

== Family ==
In 1983, Martin married Georgia Chenevix-Trench, a scientist known for her work in cancer research. Their daughter, Hilary Martin, is also a geneticist and Group Leader at the Wellcome Sanger Institute in Cambridge, United Kingdom.
