= John Jinks =

John Jinks may refer to:

- John Jinks (politician) (died 1939), Irish politician
- John L. Jinks (1929–1987), British geneticist
