= Andrew Heath =

Andrew Heath may refer to:

- Andrew Heath (minister) (1832–1887), American Baptist minister from Kentucky
- Andrew Heath (rugby union) (born 1969), Australian rugby union player
- Andrew C. Heath, Professor of Psychiatry
