= Steven G. Vandenberg =

Geneticist

- Born: July 15, 1915; Den Helder, The Netherlands
- Died: August 27, 1992 (aged 77)
- Education: University of Michigan
- Occupation: Behavior geneticist

Steven Vandenberg (July 15, 1915 in Den Helder, The Netherlands – August 27, 1992 in Boulder, Colorado, United States) was a behavior geneticist who immigrated to the US after the Second World War, obtaining his Ph.D. from the University of Michigan in 1955.

From 1960 to 1967 he worked at the University of Louisville School of Medicine as director of the Louisville Twin Study. In 1970 he moved to the Institute of Behavior Genetics at the University of Colorado at Boulder, where he remained until his retirement. Vandenberg received many honors and awards during his lifetime, including being the first recipient of the Behavior Genetics Association's Dobzhansky Career Award in 1977. Vandenberg served as President of the Behavior Genetics Association (1984–1985) and was the founding editor-in-chief of their scientific journal Behavior Genetics.
