= Lon Cardon =

American geneticist

Lon R. Cardon FMedSci
- Born: Lon Ray Cardon
- Education: University of Puget Sound; University of Colorado at Boulder
- Awards: Wellcome Trust Principal Research Fellow
- Scientific career
- Fields: Medical genetics Statistical genetics
- Institutions: The Jackson Laboratory; BioMarin Pharmaceutical; Fred Hutchinson Cancer Research Center; GlaxoSmithKline; University of Oxford; University of Washington
- Thesis: Multivariate path analysis of specific cognitive abilities in the Colorado Adoption Project (1992)
- Doctoral advisor: David W. Fulker
- Doctoral students: Gonçalo Abecasis

Lon Ray Cardon FMedSci is an American human geneticist who is President and Chief Executive Officer of The Jackson Laboratory. Previous to joining The Jackson Laboratory in 2021, he had roles as Chief Scientific Officer and Chief Scientific Strategy Officer at BioMarin Pharmaceutical and senior vice president at GlaxoSmithKline, where he worked to translate the results of genetic research regarding the causes of human diseases into improved medical treatments. Prior to his work in the pharmaceutical industry, he conducted academic research on the genetic basis of human diseases, serving as full professor at the University of Oxford in the United Kingdom from 1998 to 2006, and at the University of Washington and Fred Hutchinson Cancer Research Center in the United States from 2006 to 2008.

Cardon conducted his PhD research at the Institute for Behavior Genetics at the University of Colorado Boulder and received his postdoctoral training in the department of mathematics at Stanford University. He was elected to the Academy of Medical Sciences in 2005. He is also a fellow of the American Association for the Advancement of Science and a former Wellcome Trust Principal Research Fellow.

His research groups helped to create the present global genomics research infrastructure, including co-founding the Wellcome Trust Case Control Consortium and yielding the first Genome-Wide Association Studies.
