= David Fulker =

British behavioural geneticist (1937–1998)

David William Fulker
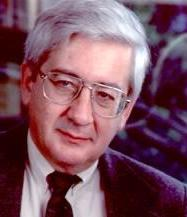
- In IBG library, c. 1995
- Born: 8 March 1937; Wales, United Kingdom
- Died: 9 July 1998 (aged 61); Boulder, Colorado, U.S
- Citizenship: British
- Education: University of Birmingham
- Scientific career
- Fields: Behavioural genetics
- Doctoral advisor: John L. Jinks
- Doctoral students: John K. Hewitt; Michael C. Neale; Lon R. Cardon

David William Fulker (8 March 1937 – 9 July 1998) was a British behavioural geneticist at the University of Colorado's Institute for Behavioral Genetics. Among positions of esteem, he was elected president of the Behavior Genetics Association (1982), and was executive editor of the society's journal Behavior Genetics. In honour of this role, the society maintains an annual Fulker Award, for the best paper in the journal each year, and for which the award is "$1000 and a decent bottle of wine".

== Contributions to behaviour genetics ==
In 1970, Fulker and John L. Jinks published a proposal that the biometric genetic approach should be applied to human behaviour. Seemingly a commonplace idea today, this was a landmark paper, and became a citation classic.

At the Institute of Psychiatry, Fulker's research established that many behaviours, not only in rodents but also in humans and in such "higher" mental traits as personality and also psychiatric diseases show genetic influences. Producing these results entailed the development of novel analytical approaches, on which Fulker collaborated with John DeFries.

Fulker worked on combining quantitative and molecular genetic approaches, adapting the DeFries–Fulker regression approach to this purpose.

With a former PhD student Lon R. Cardon (who went on to discover linkage for dyslexia on chromosome 6 and to work in the human International HapMap Project) and Stacey S. Cherny, Fulker worked on methods for linkage and association analysis of quantitative traits.

== Career ==
Fulker's father had been a miner in Wales, but moved the family to London, where Fulker grew up. He was initially trained as a teacher, and working in this profession (teaching chemistry) and as a photographer. Fulker subsequently obtained a BSc in psychology at Birkbeck College, London University, graduating with first class honours, and deciding to work in genetics.

Fulker pursued this interest, obtaining both a Masters and a PhD at Birmingham University supervised by John Jinks. Exceptionally for a post-graduate student, his first publication (on fruit fly mating) was published in Science in 1966.

Fulker joined the staff at Birmingham as a lecturer where he remained until moving in 1975 to a senior lectureship at the Institute of Psychiatry in London, where he also directed its animal laboratories at the Bethlem Royal Hospital. In 1985 Fulker moved to a professorship at the University of Colorado's Institute for Behavioral Genetics at Boulder.

In 1996, he was recruited back to the Institute of Psychiatry to the new Medical Research Council funded Social, Genetic and Developmental Psychiatry Research Centre.

Fulker was married to Angela Elliott with whom he had one child, Rosanna, born in 1985 and a stepdaughter, Katherine.
