= Twin Research and Human Genetics =

- Discipline: Genetics
- Language: English
- Edited by: Nick Martin

Publication details
- Former name: Twin Research
- History: 1998-present
- Publisher: Cambridge University Press
- Frequency: Bimonthly
- Open access: Delayed, after 12 months
- Impact factor: 1.159 (2018)

Standard abbreviations
- ISO 4: Twin Res. Hum. Genet.

Indexing
- ISSN: 1832-4274 (print); 1839-2628 (web)
- LCCN: 2005243379
- OCLC no.: 58840748

Links
- Journal homepage; Online access

Twin Research and Human Genetics is a peer-reviewed scientific journal published bimonthly by the Cambridge University Press. It is the official journal of the International Society for Twin Studies (ISTS) and the Human Genetics Society of Australasia. The journal covers research on the biology and epidemiology of twinning as well as biomedical and behavioral twin- and molecular-genetic research. According to the Journal Citation Reports, it has a 2018 impact factor of 1.159. The journal was established in 1998 and has been edited by Robert Derom (1998–1999), and Nick Martin (2000–present). The title is a translation of Acta Geneticae Medicae et Gemellologiae, from 1952 until 1978 the official organ of the Permanent Committee for the International Congresses of Human Genetics and Società italiana di genetica medica, the original title of the first journal of the ISTS.
