= International Society for Research on Aggression =

International aggression research learned society

The International Society for Research on Aggression (abbreviated ISRA) is an international learned society dedicated to scientific research on all aspects of human aggressive behavior. It was established in August 1972 in Tokyo, Japan, by a group of academics who were there to attend the 20th Annual International Congress of Psychology. The Society was co-founded by Saul Rosenzweig and John Paul Scott, who served as its first and second president, respectively. Its official journal is Aggressive Behavior, which is published by John Wiley & Sons. The current president of the society is Barbara Krahé.

== Presidents ==
Notable past presidents of the ISRA include:

- Saul Rosenzweig (first president)
- John Paul Scott (second president)
- Dan Olweus (1995-1996)
- Leonard Eron (1989–1991)
- Craig A. Anderson (2010–2012)
