= John L. Jinks =

British geneticist (1929–1987)

- Born: 21 October 1929; Stoke-on-Trent, England
- Died: 6 June 1987 (aged 57)
- Known for: Genetics and cytoplasmic inheritance
- Scientific career
- Fields: genetics
- Doctoral students: David Fulker, Lindon J. Eaves, Godfrey Hewitt

John Leonard Jinks CBE FRS (Stoke-on-Trent, 21 October 1929 – 6 June 1987) was a British geneticist. His untimely death at 57 cut short a distinguished career with many contributions in the fields of microbial genetics, cytoplasmic inheritance, and biometrical genetics.

== Career ==
He was educated at Birmingham University and remained there for the majority of his career, contributing to the development of biometrical genetics, human behavioural genetics, and supervising a number of students who went on to make their own contributions, among them David Fulker. He was a scientific officer/principal scientific officer in the ARC Unit of Biometrical Genetics from 1953 to 1965. In 1960 he was made an honorary lecturer in the Birmingham University Department of Genetics, eventually becoming Dean of the Faculty of Science and Engineering and Pro-Vice Chancellor. Elected to Fellowship of the Royal Society in 1970 he is best known for his studies of cytoplasmic inheritance and quantitative genetics.

In recounting his own career, Nobel Prize winner Sir Paul Nurse recounts how his lack of a foreign language (essential for university study in the UK in those days) had seen him rebuffed from several universities. He met Jinks fortuitously, and, recognising a promising intellect, Jinks smoothed the obstacles from Nurse's path, leading to his successful enrollment and, subsequently, Nobel winning discoveries regarding cell cycle regulation by cyclin and cyclin dependent kinases.
