= Dan Olweus =

Swedish-Norwegian psychologist (1931–2020)

- Born: April 18, 1931; Nässjö, Sweden
- Died: September 20, 2020 (aged 89)
- Education: Umeå University
- Known for: Research on bullying; Olweus Bullying Prevention Program
- Scientific career
- Fields: Psychology
- Workplaces: University of Bergen

Dan Olweus (April 18, 1931 – September 20, 2020) was a Swedish-Norwegian psychologist. He was a research professor of psychology at the University of Bergen, Norway. Olweus has been widely recognized as a pioneer of research on bullying.

== Biography ==
Olweus was born on April 18, 1931, in Nässjö, Sweden. In 1969, he earned a PhD from Umeå University in Sweden, with a dissertation on aggressive behaviour among young boys. He joined the faculty at the University of Bergen, in Norway, in 1970. He was a professor of psychology from 1970 to 1995, and was a research professor of psychology from 1996 onwards.

Olweus was a fellow at the Center for Advanced Study in the Behavioral Sciences at Stanford University from 1986 to 1987. He served as president of the International Society for Research on Aggression from 1995 to 1996.

Olweus died on September 20, 2020, at the age of 89.

== Research ==
=== Bullying ===
In the 1970s, Olweus conducted a systematic study of bullying among children. This work was published in Scandinavia in 1973, and in the United States in 1978 (as the book, Aggression in the Schools: Bullies and Whipping Boys); it is generally considered to be the first scientific study of bullying in the world. Olweus defined bullying as unwanted aggressive behaviour that is repeated over time and involves an imbalance of power or strength.

Olweus's 1993 book, Bullying at School: What We Know and What We Can Do, has been translated into 20 languages. He published the first systematic study of bullying perpetrated by teachers towards students, published in 1996.

=== Olweus Bullying Prevention Program ===
In the 1980s, Olweus conducted the first systematic study of a bullying intervention program. The success of the program led to a government-led initiative to implement the intervention (which would become known as the Olweus Bullying Prevention Program [OBPP]) throughout all Norwegian elementary and junior high schools. The program aims to reduce bullying through restructuring the school classroom and rewarding positive behaviours.

The OBPP has been systematically evaluated in a number of large-scale studies in Norway that have included more than 30,000 students. Studies have indicated a reduction in reports of being bullied and bullying others of about 35 to 45%, among students involved in the program.

One study, conducted by Olweus and Sue Limber of Clemson University in South Carolina, evaluated the effectiveness of the program in U.S. schools, including nearly 70,000 students, over the course of three years. The study found reductions in students' reports of being bullied and bullying others, as well as increases in students' expressions of empathy.

In addition to Norway and the U.S., the OBPP has been implemented in Iceland, Sweden, and Lithuania, and is being piloted in Mexico, Brazil, and Germany.

== Awards and honours ==
In 2002, Olweus received the Nordic Public Health Prize from the Nordic Council. In 2003, Olweus was given the Award for Distinguished Contributions to Public Policy for Children by the Society for Research in Child Development.

Olweus received the 2011 American Psychological Association (APA) Award for Distinguished Contributions to the International Advancement of Psychology. In 2012, he received the APA Award for Distinguished Contributions to Research in Public Policy. In 2018, he was awarded the Christie Prize from the University of Bergen.

== Selected works ==
=== Journal articles ===
- Olweus, Dan (1994). "Bullying at school: Basic facts and effects of a school-based intervention program". Journal of Child Psychology and Psychiatry. 35 (7): 1171–1190. doi:10.1111/j.1469-7610.1994.tb01229.x. PMID 7806605.
- Olweus, Dan (1997). "Bully/victim problems in school: Facts and intervention". European Journal of Psychology of Education. 12 (4): 495–510. doi:10.1007/BF03172807.
- Olweus, Dan; Limber, Susan P. (2010). "Bullying in school: Evaluation and dissemination of the Olweus Bullying Prevention Program". American Journal of Orthopsychiatry. 80 (1): 124–134. doi:10.1111/j.1939-0025.2010.01015.x. PMID 20397997.
- Olweus, Dan (2013). "School bullying: Development and some important challenges". Annual Review of Clinical Psychology. 9: 751–780. doi:10.1146/annurev-clinpsy-050212-185516. PMID 23297789.

=== Books ===
- Olweus, Dan (1978). Aggression in the Schools: Bullies and Whipping Boys. Washington, DC: Hemisphere (Wiley). ISBN 9780470993613.
- Olweus, Dan; Block, Jack; Radke-Yarrow, Marian (1986). Development of Antisocial and Prosocial Behavior: Research, Theories, and Issues. New York, NY: Academic Press. ISBN 0125258801.
- Olweus, Dan (2007). Olweus Bullying Prevention Program: Schoolwide Guide. Center City, MN: Hazelden. ISBN 978-1-59285-374-8. OCLC 212376058.
- Olweus, Dan (2013). Bullying at School: What We Know and What We Can do. Oxford, England: Blackwell (Wiley). ISBN 978-1118695807.
