= Francis Faulkner =

Francis Faulkner may refer to:

- Francis Barrett Faulkner, artist
- Major Francis Faulkner, of Faulkner House

== See also ==
- Frank Faulkner (disambiguation)
