= Frank Falkner =

American biologist and pediatrician

- Born: Frank Tardrew Falkner; October 27, 1918; Hale, Cheshire, England
- Died: August 21, 2003 (aged 84); Berkeley, California, United States
- Education: University of Cambridge
- Known for: Child development
- Spouse: June Madeleine Dixon (m. 1948)
- Children: Sally Letzer; Michael Falkner
- Parents: Ernest William Frank Falkner (father); Ethel Sommerville Letten (mother)
- Scientific career
- Fields: Pediatrics
- Workplaces: Great Ormond Street Hospital; University of Louisville School of Medicine; National Institute of Child Health and Human Development; Georgetown University; University of Cincinnati; University of Michigan

Frank Tardrew Falkner FRCP MRCP MRCS (October 27, 1918 – August 21, 2003) was a British-born American biologist and pediatrician known for his expertise on child development. After graduating from the University of Cambridge with a medical degree in 1945, he worked at Great Ormond Street Hospital in London, England, prior to joining the faculty of the University of Louisville School of Medicine in January 1956. He remained on the faculty of the University of Louisville until 1968, initially serving as an assistant professor of child health there, and eventually rising to chair their Department of Pediatrics. While on the faculty of this university, he started the Louisville Twin Study in 1957. He joined the National Institute of Child Health and Human Development as program director, later becoming an associate director there. In 1970, he became director of the Fels Longitudinal Study of Physical Growth and Development at the Fels Research Institute. He then served on the faculties of Georgetown University, the University of Cincinnati, and the University of Michigan before joining the faculty of the University of California, Berkeley and University of California, San Francisco in 1981. He was elected to the Institute of Medicine of the National Academy of Sciences in 1985. His positions within the University of California system included serving as chair of the Department of Social and Administrative Health Sciences from 1983 to 1987 and of the Maternal and Child Health Program from 1981 to 1989, both at the University of California, Berkeley. He also held a joint appointment in the department of pediatrics in the University of California, Berkeley, and helped to create the Joint Health and Medical Sciences Program connecting the two campuses. He died in his sleep on August 21, 2003, at his home in Berkeley, California, after suffering from prostate cancer.
