= Andrew C. Heath =

Psychiatry professor at Washington University in St. Louis

- Education: University of Oxford
- Known for: Research on alcoholism and behavioral genetics
- Scientific career
- Fields: Psychiatry, behavioral genetics
- Workplaces: Washington University in St. Louis

Andrew C. Heath is the Spencer T. Olin Professor of Psychiatry at the Washington University School of Medicine. He is known for his research on alcoholism and behavioral genetics. He received the Washington University in St. Louis School of Medicine's Distinguished Educator Award in 2009. His other awards include the International Society for Twin Studies's James Shields Award for Lifetime Contributions to Twin Research and the Distinguished Researcher Award from the Research Society on Alcoholism. He is a charter member of the Association for Psychological Science.

== Education and academic career ==
Heath received his D.Phil. degree in psychology from the University of Oxford in 1983. He was a faculty member at the Medical College of Virginia, where he did his postdoc, until joining the faculty of Washington University in 1989. He became a full professor at Washington University in 1996, and was named the Spencer T. Olin Professor of Psychiatry there in 2000. He has been the director of Washington University's Midwest Alcoholism Research Center since it was first funded in 1999.
