= Aggressive Behavior (journal) =

- Discipline: Psychology, behavioral science
- Language: English
- Edited by: Jane Ireland

Publication details
- History: 1974-present
- Publisher: John Wiley & Sons
- Frequency: Bimonthly
- Impact factor: 2.917 (2020)

Standard abbreviations
- ISO 4: Aggress. Behav.

Indexing
- CODEN: AGBEDU
- ISSN: 0096-140X (print); 1098-2337 (web)
- LCCN: 76644250
- OCLC no.: 435905370

Links
- Journal homepage; Online access; Online archive

Aggressive Behavior is a bimonthly peer-reviewed scientific journal covering research pertaining to aggression in, among other fields, psychology, anthropology, and sociology. It was established in 1974 and is published by John Wiley & Sons on behalf of the International Society for Research on Aggression, of which it is the official journal. The editor-in-chief is Jane Ireland (University of Central Lancashire). According to the Journal Citation Reports, the journal has a 2020 impact factor of 2.917.
