= Calvin S. Hall =

American psychologist

Calvin Springer Hall, Jr. (January 18, 1909 – April 4, 1985) was an American psychologist who studied in the fields of dream research and analysis. He began his systematic research on dreams in the 1940s, and from there he wrote many books, A Primer of Freudian Psychology and A Primer of Jungian Psychology being the best known, and developed a quantitative content analysis system for dreams. Hall's work on temperament and behavior genetics is now only a historical footnote, but was an aid to scientific studies and theories of today.

== College ==
Hall was born in Seattle, Washington. He first studied psychology at the University of Washington as an undergraduate, working with a well-known behaviorist, Edwin Guthrie. He transferred to the University of California, Berkeley, his senior year because of his opposition of the ROTC course required at Washington. At Berkeley he studied with a purposive behaviorist, Edward Tolman, and received his BA in 1930, continuing on there as a graduate student with Tolman and Robert Tryon, earning his PhD in 1933.

== Career ==
After receiving his PhD, Hall then taught for three years at the University of Oregon as an assistant professor. Because of his growing research reputation, he was appointed departmental chair and professor in psychology in 1937 at Western Reserve University. He held these positions for the next 20 years. During this time he began the process of switching his research emphasis to dream content, the area for which he is best known. Other universities he taught at were Syracuse University (1957–59), the University of Miami (1959–60), and the Radboud University Nijmegen (as a Fulbright scholar in 1960–61). From 1961 to 1965, Hall studied at his Institute of Dream Research in Miami and established the similarity in dream content throughout the night by studying dreams collected in the dream laboratory. He and Robert Van de Castle, during this time, developed a comprehensive coding system that revolutionized the objective study of dream content. In his empirical work, he showed that dreams between people across the world are more similar than they are different.

== Accomplishments ==
From 1935 to 1975, Hall was "one of the most creative and visible psychologists in the United States." He worked on the "inheritance of emotionality in rats and his discovery that a single dominant gene led to acoustical traumas in one inbred strain of mice". With this work, he made major contributions, early in is career, to the study of temperament and behavior genetics. His chapter in the "Handbook of Experimental Psychology" (1951) is considered "one of the founding statements of modern behavior genetics".

== Quantitative coding system ==
In the 1940s, Hall began three decades of systematic work on dreams that led to many theoretical, methodological, and empirical contributions. This work extended his mentor Tryon's earlier rat demonstration that they could be bred to do well or poorly in learning a maze. Hall's early work on dreams was based on reports written anonymously by college students. However, Hall soon was collecting reports from a plethora of types of children, older adults, people in other parts of the world, and those who kept dream diaries. He had over 50,000 dream reports when he died. He began his work with thematic analyses of 15 to 25 dreams from each person, looking for obvious patterns, but soon developed a quantitative coding system that divided dream content into categories such as settings, objects, characters, interactions, emotions, misfortunes, and several others. "Hall's empirical work shows the dreams of groups of people from all over the world are more similar than they are different, although there are variations in terms of cultural differences. At the same time, he found large individual differences in the frequency of dream elements; these differences correspond with waking concerns, emotional preoccupations, and interests, suggesting what Hall called 'continuity' between dream content and waking thought." His work with dream diaries showed a consistency in dream content, although there were some changes consistent with changes in the dreamers' waking lives.

== Theory ==
In 1953, Hall developed a cognitive theory of dreams. This theory states "dreams express 'conceptions' of self, family members, friends, and social environment. They reveal such conceptions as 'weak,' 'assertive,' 'unloved,' 'domineering,' and 'hostile'." Hall also developed a metaphoric theory of dream symbolism. He developed this theory through metaphoric expressions appearing in slang and poetry, with an emphasis on metaphors by George Lakoff and other cognitive linguists. Hall believed and argued that "a dream was simply a thought or sequence of thoughts that occurred during sleep, and that dream images are visual representations of personal conceptions". In other words, "dreams reflect the dreamer's unconscious self-conception which often does not at all resemble our trumped up and distorted self-portraits' by which we fool ourselves in waking life; dreams mirror the self." For example, if one has a dream of being attacked by friends, this may be a manifestation of fear of friendship. This is only true of latent dream content (the underlying meaning of the dream), not manifest dream content (the actual literal subject-matter of the dream). "The manifest dream content is not a true reflection of the self but is a distortion of oneself and one's wishes." One may only infer what a dream means because there is more than one way to do something, or in other words, more than one meaning of a dream. Hall gathered all this information from studying several thousand dreams of 'normal' people from which he did a careful comparative statistical study.

Calvin Hall's cognitive theory was based on his belief that dreams were a conceptualization of life experiences, including the environment in which the dreamer lives in and the way the dreamer perceives himself. Hall developed the following:

=== Concept of Self ===
Concept of self refers to the way the dreamer sees himself and the role he plays in his life. For example, money signifies power. The more money there is, the more powerful the dreamer is. The less money there is, the weaker the dreamer is. In a dream, the dreamer may be rich. However, in that same dream, the money could be taken away, or stolen. This signifies that although the dreamer is powerful, he has weaknesses that are hindering his power. He goes from having a lot of money, so a lot of power, to having little money, or less power.

=== Concept of Others ===
Concept of others refers to the way the dreamer perceives others. If the dreamer perceives his mother to be nurturing, then in the dreamer's dreams, his mother will be portrayed as nurturing. Likewise, if the dreamer perceives a friend to be selfish, then in the dream that friend will behave in a selfish manner.

=== Concept of the World ===
Concept of the world refers to the dreamer's view on the world. This concept is also constantly changing, because it is dependent on the dreamer's current life situation. It varies depending on his mood. If the dreamer believes the world is filled with nothing but stress, problems, and agitation, then the dream will portray hostile environments. These hostile environments can include thunderstorms and traffic jams. Furthermore, if the dreamer is thinking about the winter season, then he may dream about snow, ice, and cold weather.

=== Concept of Impulses, Prohibitions, and Penalties ===
Concept of impulses, prohibitions, and penalties refers to what the dreamer believes mankind is allowed to do, as well as what mankind is prohibited from doing. The dreamer will have a dream with some type of problematic situation, or obstacle. Within the dream, he will have impulses, or urges, to do something. The manner in which the dreamer overcomes that obstacle in order to fulfill his urge reveals what the dreamer believes is allowed and what is prohibited. If he believes something is okay to do, then the dreamer will do whatever that is in order to fix the problem and fulfill his urge. However, if the dreamer wants to do something that will overcome the obstacle, but believes it to be prohibited, then the dreamer will not do that action.

=== Concept of Problems and Conflicts ===
Concept of problems and conflicts refers to the real-life problems and struggles the dreamer is experiencing. These dreams may give hints to the dreamer, telling him how to solve the struggle he is undergoing.

== Written works ==
Year	Title	Subject
1938	"The Inheritance of Emotionality," Sigma Xi Quarterly, 26, 17-27	animal temperament
1947	"Genetic Differences in Fatal Audiogenetic Seizures between Two Inbred Strains of House Mice," Journal of Heredity, 38, 2-6	genetic basis of audiogenetic seizures in mice
1949	"The Genetics of Audiogenetic Seizures in the House Mouse," Journal of Comparative and Physiological Psychology, 42, 58-63	genetic basis of audiogenetic seizures in mice
1951	"The Genetics of Behavior," The Handbook of Experimental Psychology, edited by S. S. Stevens	temperament and genetics
1947	"Diagnosing Personality by the Analysis of Dreams," Journal of Abnormal and Social Psychology, 42, 68-79	first important article on dreams
1951	"What People Dream About," Scientific American, 184, 60-63	first report of quantitative findings
1951	Handbook of Experimental Psychology	Hall was the author of one chapter
1953	"A Cognitive Theory of Dreams," Journal of General Psychology, 49, 273-282	highly original theoretical article on dreams
1953	The Meaning of Dreams	
1953	"A Cognitive Theory of Dream Symbols," Journal of General Psychology, 48, 169-186	metaphoric theory of dream symbols
1954	A Primer of Freudian Psychology	
1957	Theories of Personality	
1966	The Content Analysis of Dreams	coding system co-authored with Robert Van de Castle
1970	Dreams, Life, and Literature	Kafka
1971	Personality of a Child Molester	the child molester
1972	The Individual and His Dreams	
1973	A Primer of Jungian Psychology	
1994	Our Dreaming Mind, by Robert Van de Castle	overview of Hall's work by his collaborator
1996	Finding Meaning in Dreams: A Quantitative Approach	all reliable findings with the Hall/Van de Castle coding system by G. William Domhoff
1987	"Calvin Springer Hall (1909-1985)," American Psychologist, 42, 185	appreciation of Hall and his work by long-time friend and co-author, Gardner Lindzey.

== Personal life ==
His wife, Irene Hannah Sanborn, from whom he had separated, died before him. He died in Santa Cruz County, California in 1985 at the age of 76 of cancer. They had one child.
