= International Society for Twin Studies =

Scientific organization

- Formation: 1974
- Founder: Luigi Gedda
- Founded at: Rome, Italy
- Publication: Twin Research and Human Genetics (CUP)
- Website: https://twinstudies.org/

The International Society for Twin Studies (ISTS) is an international, non-profit scientific organization. The aim of the society is to advance research and knowledge in all fields of science related to twins and/or twin studies, for the benefit of both twins and their families as well as worldwide scientific communities.

== International Congress on Twin Studies ==
The International Congress on Twin Studies (ICTS) is a tri-ennial conference organised by the ISTS. Past locations include Budapest, Florence, Seoul, Ghent, Odense, London and others.

== Journal ==
Twin Research and Human Genetics is the official journal of the International Society for Twin Studies.

== James Shields Award ==
The James Shields Award for Lifetime Contributions to Twin Research is an award created in 1980 in honor of James Shields, a pioneering researcher in human behavior genetics. Winners usually receive the award at the International Congress on Twin Studies or at the annual meeting of the Behavior Genetics Association. Past winners include Lindon Eaves, Peter Propping, Nick Martin, Dorret Boomsma, Nancy Segal, Matt McGue, Robert Plomin, John K. Hewitt and others.
