= Louisville Twin Study =

Research dataset

The Louisville Twin Study is a longitudinal twin study which was started in 1957 at the University of Louisville by Frank Falkner. It started with 885 twins that were born in metropolitan Louisville, Kentucky and these were randomly selected to cover the full demographic spectrum of its population. The main phase of activity was in the first 40 years and the participants were repeatedly tested at different ages throughout that period. Hundreds of papers were then published from this data. In 2014, the data was digitised and further efforts have been made to contact and study the surviving subjects.
