= John L. Fuller =

American biologist (1910–1992)

- Born: July 22, 1910; Brandon, Vermont, U.S
- Died: June 8, 1992 (aged 81); Cambridge, Massachusetts, U.S
- Resting place: Bar Harbor, Maine, U.S
- Education: Massachusetts Institute of Technology
- Scientific career
- Fields: Ethology, Psychology; Behavior genetics
- Workplaces: Binghamton University; Jackson Laboratory
- Thesis: A Comparison of the Physiology, Ecology and Distribution of Some New England Woodlice (1935)

John Langworthy Fuller (July 22, 1910 – June 8, 1992) was an American biologist and early pioneer of behavior genetics. Fuller was a researcher at the Jackson Laboratory from 1947 to 1970 and professor (and later chair) of psychology at the Binghamton University from 1970 until retiring in 1977.

== Selected works ==
=== Books ===
- John L. Fuller (1954). Nature and Nurture: A Modern Synthesis.
- Fuller 1960, "Behavior Genetics", Annual Review of Psychology, 11(1), 41–70. doi:10.1146/annurev.ps.11.020160.000353
- John L. Fuller; W. R. Thompson (1960). Behavior Genetics.
- John Paul Scott; John L. Fuller (1965). Genetics and the Social Behavior of the Dog (PDF).
- John L. Fuller; W. R. Thompson (1973). Foundations of Behavior Genetics.
- John L. Fuller; Edward C. Simmel (1983). Behavior Genetics: Principles and Applications.
- John L. Fuller; Edward C. Simmel (1986). Perspectives in Behavior Genetics.
