= Behavior Genetics (journal) =

- Discipline: Behavior genetics
- Language: English
- Edited by: Valerie Knopik

Publication details
- History: 1971–present
- Publisher: Springer Science+Business Media
- Frequency: Bimonthly
- Open access: Hybrid
- Impact factor: 2.6 (2023)

Standard abbreviations
- ISO 4: Behav. Genet.

Indexing
- CODEN: BHGNAT
- ISSN: 0001-8244 (print); 1573-3297 (web)
- LCCN: 77015467
- OCLC no.: 01519335

Links
- Journal homepage; Online archive

Behavior Genetics is a bimonthly peer-reviewed scientific journal published by Springer Science+Business Media. It covers "research in the inheritance of behavior" and is the official journal of the Behavior Genetics Association. The journal was established in 1971 with Steven G. Vandenberg as its founding editor-in-chief. He was succeeded by Jan Bruell (1978–1986). Each year, the editorial board chooses a particularly meritorious paper in the previous year's volume of the journal for the Editors' Choice Award, acknowledged by "$1000 and a good bottle of wine" as well as a citation made in the journal. This award was created in the honor of David Fulker, a past president of the Behavior Genetics Association (1982) and former editor-in-chief (1987–1998). From 2001–2025, John K. Hewitt was editor-in-chief. He was succeeded by Valerie Knopik (2025–present). The abstracts of the annual meetings are printed in the journal.

== Abstracting and indexing ==
The journal is abstracted and indexed in Biological Abstracts/BIOSIS Previews, CAB Abstracts, Current Awareness in Biological Sciences, Current Contents/Social & Behavioral Sciences and Life Sciences, Embase, PsycINFO, MEDLINE/PubMed, Science Citation Index Expanded, Scopus, Social Sciences Citation Index, and The Zoological Record. According to the Journal Citation Reports, the journal has a 2023 impact factor of 2.6.
