= Adoption study =

Type of research study used in behavioral genetics

Adoption studies typically compare pairs of persons, e.g., adopted child and adoptive mother or adopted child and biological mother, to assess genetic and environmental influences on behavior. These studies are one of the classic research methods of behavioral genetics. The method is used alongside twin studies to identify the roles of genetics and environmental variables that impact intelligence, and behavioral disorders.

Adoption studies differ from twin studies in that adoption studies do not necessarily need to use twins; instead, they compare the traits of children to their parents, whether those are the adoptive parents or biological parents.

== Study designs and methods ==
There are two standard ways in which adoption studies are carried out; the adoptee's study method and the adoptee's family method. The adoptee's study method compares adoptee's similarity to their biological and adoptive parents. Similarity with the biological parent is expected to be due to genetics, while similarity with the adoptive parent is due to home-environment, which is referred as the shared environmental effect. The adoptee's family method compares non-biological siblings who are reared in the same household. Similarity to non-biological siblings raised in the same household is attributed to shared environmental effect, as the siblings are genetically unrelated but share the home environment. Variation that cannot be accounted for by either genetics or home-environment is typically described as a non-shared environment.

== Examples ==
=== Mental disorders ===
The first adoption study on schizophrenia published in 1966 by Leonard Heston demonstrated that the biological children of parents with schizophrenia were just as likely to develop schizophrenia whether they were reared by their parents or adopted and was essential in establishing schizophrenia as being largely genetic instead of being a result of child rearing methods. Analogous studies that followed have shown that mental disorders such as alcoholism, antisocial behavior and depression have a large genetic component that can interact with environmental risk factors such as family conflict, poor coherence, and deviant communication.

=== Cognitive ability ===
The most cited adoption projects that sought to estimate the heritability of IQ were those of Texas, Colorado and Minnesota that were started in the 1970s. These studies showed that while adoptive parents IQ does seem to have a correlation with adoptees IQ in early life, when the adoptees reach adolescence the correlation has faded and disappeared. The correlation with the biological parent seemed to explain most of the variation. In 2015 an adoption study that compared Swedish male-male full-sibships in which at least one member was reared by one or more biological parents and the other by adoptive parents was published. Parental education level was rated on a 5-point scale and each additional unit of rearing parental education was associated with 1.71 points higher IQ. The results were replicated with 2 341 male-male half-sibships, controlling for clustering within families, each additional unit of rearing parental education was associated with 1.94 IQ units. The study in Minnesota was conducted by Bouchard. It had an emphasis on identical twins that were separated and raised by different families.

=== Crime ===
One of the most influential and widely cited adoption study on criminality was conducted by Sarnoff A. Mednick and Karl O. Christiansen in Denmark. They argued that relevant data demonstrated that criminality has a significant genetic component that interacts with environmental risk factors. Adoption studies that followed have had similar results."The Stockholm adoption study (2000 adoptees) found that criminality alone was not transmitted from biological parents to adoptees, but did find elevated rates of criminality in adopted-away offspring of biological parents with alcohol use disorders (AUD) alone, or with both AUD and criminality (Bohman, 1978)."

=== Alcoholism ===
In the mid-1970s, adoption studies were conducted to investigate the effects on children of having a biological parent with alcoholism. The study found that sons whose biological father has alcoholism were four times more likely to develop alcoholism within their lifetime, but were not more likely to have other mental disorders. The study, was unable to conclude what the impact was on daughters. A more recent study was published in 2009 which compared the parental alcoholism of children in non-adoptive and adoptive families. This study found that the likelihood of children developing alcoholism later in life was associated more with genetic rather than environmental factors.

=== Obesity ===
Adoption studies have been used to study childhood obesity. This study showed a strong correlation for the environmental argument. Children were strongly influenced by adopted parents weight till mid childhood. During adolescence this dissipated. This study also showed that the biological parents and children had an even stronger correlation when it came to weight and BMI. This put more emphasis on genes than environment.

== History ==
In the early to mid-nineteen hundreds, we can find some evidence of adoption studies. These studies were thought to be very important as they wanted to match children with parents in every way possible. They thought they should be similar in looks, class, and mental capacities. They had methods of testing children to find out how smart they were. Mental tests were popularized by Goddard who used a version of the Binet scale. The Gesell Scale was made and became the most widely used by adoption agencies in the 1940s. This is a way of testing a baby's intelligence. This is determined through normal growth, development, and mental milestones. This raised some social and moral issues some children were deemed unfit for adoption because of their low mental test scores. The outcome of these selective adoption studies found that ultimately had no effect on the happiness or success of the children. It also had no effect on the satisfaction of the parents.

== Sources ==
- Haimowitz, Avi G. "Heredity Versus Environment: Twin, Adoption, and Family Studies". Great Ideas in Personality.
- "Interactive Tutorials: Using Twin and Adoption Studies". PHG Foundation. Archived from the original on 2017-05-14.
- "Adoption Study". Glossary of Psychology. n.d.
- Kaplan, Arline (27 January 2009). "Adoption and Mental Illness". Psychiatric Times.
- Newman et al. 1937, Twins: A Study of Heredity and Environment
- Shields 1962, Monozygotic Twins: Brought Up Apart And Brought Up Together
- Juel-Nielsen 1980, Individual and Environment: Monozygotic Twins Reared Apart
