= Behavior Genetics Association =

Learned society established in 1970

- Abbreviation: BGA
- Formation: June 1, 1971; 55 years ago
- Legal status: Association
- Purpose: To promote the field of behavioural genetics
- Region served: Worldwide
- Official language: English
- President: Jenae Neiderhiser
- Main organ: Executive committee
- Website: www.bga.org

The Behavior Genetics Association (BGA) is a learned society established in 1970 that promotes research into the connections between heredity and behavior, both human and animal. Its members support education and training in behavior genetics and publish Behavior Genetics, a journal on the topic.

== Aims ==
According to the association, its goals are "to promote scientific study of the interrelationship of genetic mechanisms and behavior, both human and animal; to encourage and aid the education and training of research workers in the field of behavior genetics; and to aid in the dissemination and interpretation to the general public of knowledge concerning the interrelationship of genetics and behavior, and its implications for health and human development and education." To further these goals, the society organizes an annual meeting and publishes the scientific journal Behavior Genetics. The annual meeting is held in a different location every year.

== Membership ==
The society has three classes of members: Regular consisting of persons who teach or perform research related to behavioral genetics, Associate Members – students in good standing at a recognized college or university and retired members. Members receive a complimentary subscription to the society's journal as well as discounted registration rates for the association's annual meetings.

== Governance ==
The society's business are conducted by a board of directors, called the executive committee. The board consists of 9 members: president, president-elect, past-president, secretary, treasurer, an information officer, and three members-at-large (representing the general members, associate members, and members from outside North America). Members of the executive committee serve three-year terms. To ensure continuity, one member-at-large is elected every year.

=== Presidents ===
Presidents serve three-year terms. Upon election, they become president-elect and they serve as chair of the program committee for that year. After one year they become president and in the third year of their term they serve as past-president. The association's first president was Theodosius Dobzhansky. Other notable presidents include Irving I. Gottesman (1976), John C. Loehlin (1980), Steven G. Vandenberg (1984), Sandra Scarr (1985), Robert Plomin (1989), Thomas J. Bouchard, Jr. (1993), Glayde Whitney (1994), Nick Martin (1996–1997), and Dorret Boomsma (2008). Whitney's presidential address at the 1995 annual meeting in Richmond, Virginia, claiming genetic roots of the relationship between race and crime, caused a controversy resulting in several resignations from the association's executive committee. The association subsequently declared that "the Association has no official spokesman and that the presidential address does not represent official policy of the association". In addition, it was stated that "members are not encouraged to express their personal political and moral views" in presentations given at the meeting, which should be strictly scientific.

== Awards ==
The association gives several yearly awards for accomplishments in the field of behavioral genetics. The Dobzhansky Award, named after its first president, is given for lifetime accomplishments and is chosen by the three most recent past presidents. The Fuller & Scott Award is an early career award for accomplishments by researchers that are within seven years of receiving their terminal degree. The award is named after former presidents John L. Fuller and John Paul Scott and the award committee is the same as for the Dobzhansky Award. The Thompson and Rowe awards, are named after former president W. R. Thompson (1977), and David C. Rowe, a pioneer of Gene-Environment interaction research respectively. The Thompson is given for the oral presentation given by an associate (student) member, and judged as most outstanding during the annual meeting. The Rowe similarly recognises the most outstanding student poster presentation. The awards committee for these awards consists of the past president together with the three members-at-large of the executive committee. In addition, the society gives the annual Fulker Award for an outstanding paper published in Behavior Genetics. This award is named after former president David Fulker (1983), who also was a previous editor-in-chief of the journal. The awards committee consists of the journal's editorial advisory board.

== See also ==
- Behavioral genetics
- Human behavior genetics
