= Sjeng Kerbusch =

Dutch behavior geneticist

- Born: 1947; Maastricht, The Netherlands
- Died: 1 March 1991 (aged 43–44); Nijmegen, The Netherlands
- Citizenship: Dutch
- Education: Radboud University Nijmegen
- Scientific career
- Fields: Behavioural genetics
- Workplaces: Radboud University Nijmegen
- Doctoral advisor: J. Vossen
- Notable students: Franz-Josef van der Staay

Sjeng Kerbusch (1947 - 1 March 1991) was a Dutch behavior geneticist.

A native of Maastricht, he obtained his Ph.D. from the Catholic University Nijmegen in 1974 becoming the third Dutchman in this field. Kerbusch' specialism was the application of quantitative-genetic methods, especially diallel crosses and Mendelian crosses, to the analysis of behavior. From 1984 to 1987, he was President of the Dutch Behavior Genetics Contact Group and in 1988 he was local host for the 18th Annual Meeting of the Behavior Genetics Association held in Nijmegen, The Netherlands. Kerbusch died at Nijmegen from complications after a lung transplant.

== Notable publications ==
- Peeters BWMM; Kerbusch JML; Coenen AML; Vossen JMH; van Luijtelaar ELJM (May 1992). "Genetics of spike-wave discharges in the electroencephalogram (EEG) of the WAG/Rij inbred rat strain: a classical mendelian crossbreeding study". Behavior Genetics. 22 (3): 361–8. doi:10.1007/BF01066667. PMID 1616465. S2CID 32623463.
- Peeters BWMM; Kerbusch JML; van Luijtelaar ELJM; Vossen JMH; Coenen AML (May 1990). "Genetics of absence epilepsy in rats". Behavior Genetics. 20 (3): 453–60. doi:10.1007/BF01065569. PMID 2116125. S2CID 29888531.
- van Luijtelaar ELJM; van der Staay FJ; Kerbusch JML (August 1989). "Spatial memory in rats: a cross validation study". The Quarterly Journal of Experimental Psychology. B, Comparative and Physiological Psychology. 41 (3): 287–306. PMID 2798928.
