= Wim Crusio =

Dutch behavioral neurogeneticist

Wim E. Crusio
- Wilhelmus Elisabeth Crusio
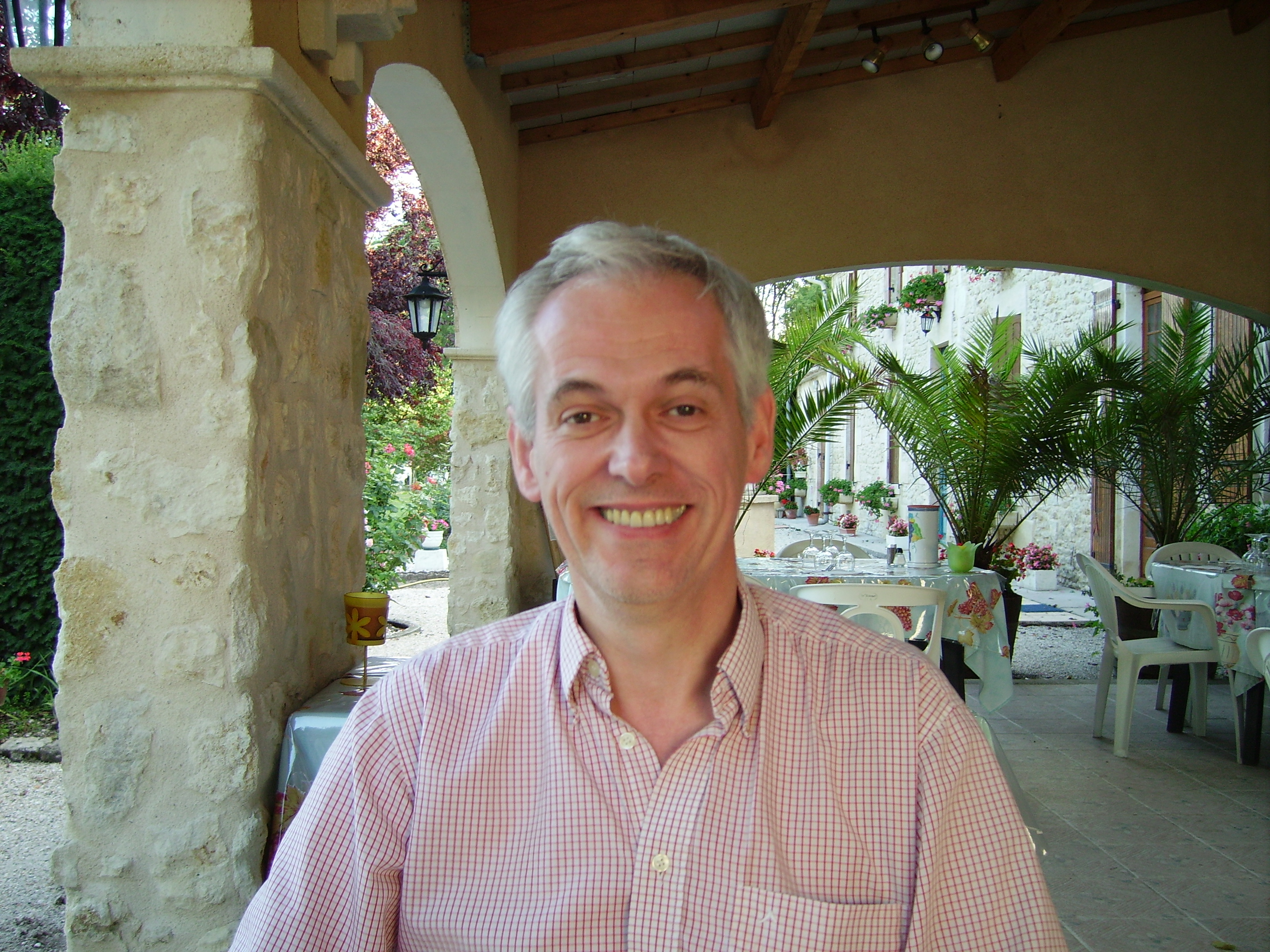
- Crusio in August 2006
- Born: 20 December 1954 (age 71); Bergen op Zoom, The Netherlands
- Citizenship: Dutch
- Education: Radboud University Nijmegen
- Known for: Behavioral neurogenetics of the hippocampus, mouse models of neuropsychiatric disorders
- Awards: IBANGS Distinguished Service Award
- Scientific career
- Fields: behavioral and neural genetics, behavioral neuroscience
- Workplaces: Radboud University Nijmegen, University of Heidelberg, French National Centre for Scientific Research (CNRS; Paris, Orleans, and Talence (Bordeaux)), University of Massachusetts Medical School
- Thesis: Olfaction and behavioral responses to novelty in mice: a quantitative-genetic analysis (1984)
- Doctoral advisor: Hans van Abeelen
- Other academic advisors: Bram van Overbeeke, Hendrik de Wit, Victor Westhoff
- Author abbrev. (botany): Crusio
- Website: wimcrusio.com

Wim E. Crusio (born Wilhelmus Elisabeth Crusio on 20 December 1954) is a Dutch behavioral neurogeneticist and a directeur de recherche (research director) with the French National Centre for Scientific Research in Talence, France.

== Education and career ==
Crusio received his bachelor's degree in biology from Radboud University Nijmegen in 1975, where he went on to obtain a master's degree and then a PhD in 1979 and 1984, respectively. His Anubias revision, which was originally published in 1979, was translated in German and continues to engender interest. For his PhD thesis, Crusio studied the inheritance of the effects of anosmia on exploratory behavior of mice, and more in general the genetic architecture of exploratory behavior, using quantitative-genetic methods such as the diallel cross.

From 1984 to 1987, Crusio worked as a postdoc at the University of Heidelberg, supported by a NATO Science Fellowship and an Alexander von Humboldt Research Fellowship. During 1988, Crusio spent a year in Paris, France, supported by a fellowship from the Fyssen Foundation. He then returned to Heidelberg as a senior research scientist before being recruited as chargé de recherche by the CNRS, initially working in an institute of the Université René Descartes (Paris V) and later moving to the CNRS campus in Orléans, having been promoted to directeur de recherche. In 2000 he became full professor of psychiatry at the University of Massachusetts Medical School in Worcester, Massachusetts, returning to the CNRS in 2005 as a group leader in the Centre de Neurosciences Intégratives et Cognitives in Talence, a suburb of Bordeaux. He is currently adjunct director of the Institut de Neurosciences Cognitives et Intégratives d'Aquitaine.

== Research ==
=== Hippocampal mossy fibers ===
Crusio and his collaborators found that neuroanatomical variations in the mouse hippocampus, in particular the sizes of their intra- and infrapyramidal mossy fibers (IIPMF) correlated with learning performance. Together with Herbert Schwegler and Hans-Peter Lipp, Crusio showed that an inverse correlation, that is, animals with larger IIPMF learn better, could be found for spatial learning in a radial arm maze task. Taken together, Crusio and collaborators think that it is highly likely that this correlation is causal, although this is not universally accepted.

=== Mouse model of depression ===
When mice are exposed to unpredictable chronic mild stress (UCMS), they start exhibiting symptoms reminiscent of major depressive disorder in humans. As it had been suggested that deficits in hippocampal neurogenesis might underlie depression, Crusio and collaborators undertook a series of experiments investigating changes in behavior and neurogenesis in mice that had undergone UCMS. They showed dramatic changes in levels of aggression, anxiety, depressive-like behaviors, and learning, with a concomitant drop in neurogenesis. However, the results were strain- and sex-specific and there did not appear to be a clear-cut correlation between the different changes, so that they finally concluded that although their data do not disprove the idea that deficits in hippocampal neurogenesis solely underlie the behavioral impairments observed in human psychiatric disorders such as depression, they do not provide support for this hypothesis either.

=== Mouse model of autism ===
More recently, Crusio has been investigating the possibility that Fmr1 knockout mice might perhaps be used as a model for autism. This idea is based on the fact that patients suffering from the Fragile X syndrome, caused by a deficiency of the FMR1 gene often show autistic symptoms. A good mouse model for the Fragile X syndrome is available in the form of mice in which the Fmr1 gene (the mouse homologue of the human FMR1 gene) has been invalidated. A review of the findings obtained with these mice in many different laboratories did indeed indicate that these animals display autistic-like symptoms, especially changes in social behavior, a key symptom of autism.

== Editorial activities ==
Crusio is the founding editor-in-chief of Genes, Brain and Behavior, which he edited from 2001 to 2011. The standards for the publication of mouse mutant studies that he and his co-editors developed for this journal are gradually being accepted in the field. Since 2017, Crusio is the editor-in-chief of Behavioral and Brain Functions and since 2019 co-editor of Advances in Experimental Medicine and Biology. He is also an academic editor of PLoS ONE and served as associate editor of Behavioral and Brain Sciences (1991–2008) and The Scientific World Journal (2002-2011). Crusio serves or has served on the editorial boards of Behavioral and Brain Functions, Behavior Genetics (1991–1995), Behavioural Brain Research (1997–2007), BMC Neuroscience, BMC Research Notes, Frontiers in Behavioral Neuroscience, Journal of Visualized Experiments, Molecular Brain (2012-2017), Neurogenetics (1998–2006), Physiology and Behavior, and Current Opinion in Behavioral Sciences. He edited special issues for the journals Behavior Genetics, Behavioural Brain Research, Physiology and Behavior (with Robert Gerlai), Hippocampus (with Aryeh Routtenberg), and Brain Research Bulletin (with Catherine Belzung and Robert Gerlai). Together with Robert Gerlai he also edited a handbook on molecular genetic techniques for behavioral neuroscience. Currently, he is editing the Cambridge Handbooks in Behavioral Genetics, a series of handbooks published by Cambridge University Press, of which the first volume, Behavioral Genetics of the Mouse: Genetics of Behavioral Phenotypes, appeared in 2013. Since then, two more volumes have appeared.

== Community service ==
In 1996, Crusio was one of two co-founders of the International Behavioural and Neural Genetics Society, for which he served as member-at-large of the executive committee, treasurer, and president (1998–2001). In 2011 he received from this society the "Distinguished Service Award", which is given for exceptional contributions to the field of behavioral neurogenetics. Crusio also served on the executive committees of the Behavior Genetics Association (from which he resigned in protest to Glayde Whitney's 1995 presidential address), the European Brain and Behaviour Society, and the International Behavioral Neuroscience Society, and has been a President of the Dutch Behavior Genetics Contact Group. He has been a member of several program committees for scientific meetings, most notably the 8th and 10th World Congresses of Psychiatric Genetics and the 2008, 2009 (co-chair), 2010 (chair), and 2011 (chair) Annual Meetings of the IBNS.

== Significant papers ==
According to Google Scholar, Crusio's works have been cited over 11,000 times and he has an h-index of 50. Some significant papers are:

- Crusio, W. E.; Genthner-Grimm, G.; Schwegler, H. (2007). "A quantitative-genetic analysis of hippocampal variation in the mouse". Journal of Neurogenetics. 21 (4, Special Retrospective Issue: The Origins of Neurogenetics): 197–208. doi:10.1080/01677060701715827. PMID 18161583. S2CID 7334116. Original publication: Crusio, W. E.; Genthner-Grimm, G.; Schwegler, H. (July 1986). "A quantitative-genetic analysis of hippocampal variation in the mouse". Journal of Neurogenetics. 3 (4): 203–214. doi:10.3109/01677068609106850. PMID 3746523.
- Crusio, W. E.; Schwegler, H.; Lipp, H. P. (November 1987). "Radial-maze performance and structural variation of the hippocampus in mice: a correlation with mossy fibre distribution". Brain Research. 425 (1): 182–185. doi:10.1016/0006-8993(87)90498-7. PMID 3427419. S2CID 39198617.
- Crusio, W. E.; Schwegler, H.; van Abeelen, J. H. F. (February 1989). "Behavioral responses to novelty and structural variation of the hippocampus in mice. II. Multivariate genetic analysis". Behavioural Brain Research. 32 (1): 81–88. doi:10.1016/S0166-4328(89)80075-0. PMID 2930637. S2CID 42291976.
- Crusio W. E. (November 2001). "Genetic dissection of mouse exploratory behaviour". Behavioural Brain Research. 125 (1–2): 127–132. doi:10.1016/S0166-4328(01)00280-7. PMID 11682103. S2CID 28031277.
- Crusio, W. E.; Goldowitz, D.; Holmes, A.; Wolfer, D. (February 2009). "Standards for the publication of mouse mutant studies". Genes, Brain and Behavior. 8 (1): 1–4. doi:10.1111/j.1601-183X.2008.00438.x. PMID 18778401. S2CID 205853147.
