= Marla Sokolowski =

Ecologist and evolutionary biologist

- Born: July 20, 1955 (age 71); Toronto, Ontario, Canada
- Other name: Marla Sokolowski
- Occupation: Behavioral geneticist
- Years active: 1981–present
- Known for: discovery of the foraging gene
- Title: University Professor
- Children: 2

Academic background
- Education: University of Toronto
- Thesis: Evolution of Behavioural Strategies in Drosophila: genetic analyses (1980)

Academic work
- Discipline: Behavioral genetics; epigenetics; evolutionary biology
- Main interests: behaviour genetics; drosophila neurogenetics; gene by environment interactions; genomics; molecular
- Website: https://sokolowski.eeb.utoronto.ca/

Marla B. Sokolowski FRSC is a University Professor in the Department of Ecology and Evolutionary Biology at the University of Toronto. Sokolowski is a scientist whose work is widely considered to be groundbreaking, foundational for a variety of fields, and instrumental in refutations of genetic determinism, and has, according to the Royal Society of Canada, "permanently changed the way we frame questions about individual differences in behaviour". Sokolowski's comprehensive study of the fruit fly and other animal systems, including humans, has shaped fundamental concepts in behavioural evolution, plasticity, and genetic pleiotropy. Specifically, Sokolowski is best known for her discovery of the foraging gene. Sokolowski was the 2020 recipient of the Flavelle Medal. Sokolowski is only one of two women to ever win the award- the other being Margaret Newton in 1948.

== Personal life ==
Marla Sokolowski was born in Toronto in 1955 to Ruth and Ernest Berger- the latter of which was a Holocaust survivor who immigrated to Canada where he worked as a shoe salesman. Sokolowski is married to Allen Sokolowski, who worked as a dentist and taught at the University of Toronto Faculty of Dentistry. They have two children: one daughter, Moriah Sokowski (born 1991) and one son, Dustin Sokolowski (born 1995).

== Academic career ==
=== Research ===
Sokolowski completed her undergraduate degree at the University of Toronto in Zoology in 1977. Sokolowski's early research into evolutionary biology was influenced by Richard Lewontin and Douglas Wahlsten. At the time, very few scientists believed that it was possible for genes to influence normal individual differences in behaviours. This set the stage for Sokolowski's 1980 Ph.D thesis and subsequent research into behavioral genetics.

Sokolowski's research has definitively demonstrated how genes interact with the environment, and thus have an impact on behaviour. She has pioneered the development of a branch of behaviour genetics that addresses the genetic and molecular bases of natural individual differences in behaviour. This is demonstrated most clearly in her discovery of the foraging(for) gene.

By mapping the movement patterns of Drosophila, she discovered a single gene that influenced the style of foraging that they used. Sokolowski's subsequent cloning of this gene, which she named foraging (for), was the first ever molecular characterization of a gene which regulates normal individual differences in a behaviour. This gene has since been studied in many other animals, including humans. Sokolowski demonstrated that the for gene can be influenced by the environment of the individual: this means that the style of foraging is dependent on the life that the individual has lived.

Sokolowski has applied her work to early childhood development, demonstrating how children who are at risk can benefit from nutritional, financial, educational and emotional interventions.

== Awards and honours ==
In 2021, the Journal of Neurogenetics published a special issue in her honor.

=== Fellowships ===
- The Weston Fellow, Canadian Institute for Advanced Research
- Distinguished Fellow, Canadian Institute for Advanced Research
- Senior Fellow, Massey College (2001)
- Fellow, Royal Society of Canada (1998)

=== Awards ===
- J.J. Berry Smith Doctoral Supervision Award from the University of Toronto for "her commitment and success in guiding graduate students, providing a supportive and stimulating learning experience, inspiring excellence in academic scholarship and integrity, and preparing them for their future careers".
- Flavelle Medal from the Royal Society of Canada "for an outstanding contribution to biological science during the preceding ten years or for significant additions to a previous outstanding contribution to biological science". (2020)
- Distinguished Investigator Award from the International Behavioural and Neural Genetics Society (2014)
- Queen Elizabeth Diamond Jubilee Medal (2013)
- The Genetics Society of Canada William F Grant and Peter B Moens Award of Excellence (2007)
- Tier 1 Canada Research Chair in Genetics and Behavioural Neurology (since 2001-02-014)
- Young Scientist Award, Genetics Society of Canada (1993)
- Current University Professor from the University of Toronto (2010)

=== Positions ===
- Director of the Life Sciences Division of the Academy of Sciences of the Royal Society of Canada (2009-2012)
- Co-Director of the Child and Brain Development Program, CIFAR (2008-2019)
- Co-Director of the Experience Based Brain and Biological Development, CIFAR
- Inaugural Academic Director of the Fraser Mustard Institute for Human Development at University of Toronto (2012)
- Member of the Advisory Committee for The Science of Early Child Development
- Chair of the Gordon Research Conference on Genes and Behaviour Conference (2008)

== Publications ==
Sokolowski has published over 200 scientific papers, has numerous contributions to books, and several editorials in news papers.

== See also ==
- Karla Kaun
