= Robert Gerlai =

Canadian behaviour geneticist

Robert T. Gerlai
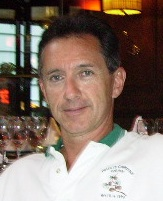
- Gerlai in August 2009
- Born: 1960 (age 65–66); Budapest, Hungary
- Citizenship: Canadian
- Education: Eötvös Loránd University
- Scientific career
- Fields: Behavior genetics
- Workplaces: University of Toronto Mississauga
- Doctoral advisor: Vilmos Csanyi
- Website: https://www.utm.utoronto.ca/gerlai-lab/home

Robert T. Gerlai is a Canadian behaviour geneticist, behavioural neuroscientist, and professor at the University of Toronto Mississauga.

== Early life and education ==
Gerlai obtained his PhD in 1987 from the Eötvös Loránd University and the Hungarian Academy of Sciences in Budapest.

== Career ==
Gerlai has worked in the biotechnology (Genentech) and biopharmaceutical research industries (Eli Lilly and Company and Saegis Pharmaceuticals) as Senior Scientist and Vice President of Research, and led pre-clinical as well as clinical research teams developing drugs to treat mild cognitive impairment and Alzheimer's Disease. He also worked at different universities in North America and Europe. He is a Distinguished Professor of behavioral neuroscience in the Department of Psychological and Brain Sciences at the University of Toronto Mississauga.

The Web of Science lists over 350 peer-reviewed publications for Gerlai, which have been cited over 20000 times, resulting in an h-index of 75. Gerlai has worked with several different animal species, including paradise fish and mice. He was among the first to use transgenic mice in the analysis of learning and memory and showed that astrocytes play important roles in synaptic plasticity. He is also known for discovering the role of Eph tyrosine kinases and their ephrin ligands in neuronal plasticity. He is considered a leader of zebrafish behavioral neuroscience research, and has been using this species for studies on the effects of alcohol on brain function and behaviour, including social behaviour, fear-anxiety, and learning and memory.

== Honours ==
Gerlai is an elected Fellow of the International Behavioral Neuroscience Society, of which he also has been president. He is editor-in-chief of Behavioral and Brain Functions and neuroscience editor of the book series Advances in Experimental Medicine and Biology. He is a member of the editorial boards of Biology, Genes, Brain and Behavior, Neurotoxicology and Teratology, Learning and Behavior, Current Opinion in Behavioral Sciences, Zebrafish, and F1000. He is section editor for behavioral neuroscience of BMC Neuroscience. In 2013, Gerlai received the Distinguished Scientist Award from the International Behavioural and Neural Genetics Society. In 2015, he received the Research Excellence Award from the University of Toronto. In 2019 he received the Outstanding Achievement Award from the International Behavioral Neuroscience Society. In 2019 and again in 2024, he received the 5-year John Carlin Roder Distinguished Professorship in Behavioural Neuroscience at the University of Toronto Mississauga. In 2023, he was elected Fellow of the Royal Society of Canada, Academy of Science. In 2024, he received the IQ Consortium/AAALAC International Global 3Rs Award for his significant and innovative contributions to ethical and humane use of animals in research.
