= Karla Kaun =

- Born: 1979 (age 46–47)
- Education: University of Toronto
- Awards: IBANGS Early Career Achievement (2018) National Association of Biology Teachers Genetics Education Award (2023)
- Scientific career
- Fields: Behavioral Neurogenetics
- Workplaces: Brown University
- Thesis: Neurogenetic and plastic components of food-related behaviors due to the foraging gene in Drosophila melanogaster (2007)
- Doctoral advisor: Marla Sokolowski
- Other academic advisors: Ulrike Heberlein
- Website: www.kaunlab.com

Karla R. Kaun (1979) is a Canadian/American behavioral neurogeneticist and an associate professor of neuroscience at Brown University, where she is principal investigator of a laboratory that studies the Behavioral Neurogenetics of Addiction. Kaun investigates the neural and molecular mechanisms of addiction and reward using fruit flies (Drosophila melanogaster), as a model.

== Education and career ==
Kaun obtained her BSc in biopsychology at the University of British Columbia in 2003 and her the PhD in 2007 at the University of Toronto under the supervision of Marla Sokolowski. She followed up with postdoctoral training with Ulrike Heberlein (2007-2011: University of California, San Francisco; 2011-2013: Janelia Research Campus). In 2013 she was recruited as an assistant professor at Brown University; she was promoted to associate professor in 2020. As of 2013, Kaun has published over 40 articles that have been cited over 2800 times, giving her an h-index of 25.

Kaun is an advocate for science communication and mental health research. In 2015 she was named the Robert J and Nancy D Carney Assistant Professor of Neuroscience, and in 2018 she was an International Behavioral and Neural Genetics Society (IBANGS) Early Career Achievement awardee. In 2023 Kaun was awarded the Genetics Education Award by the National Association of Biology Teachers, and in 2023-24 she was President of the International Behavioural and Neural Genetics Society. Kaun is currently an Associate Editor for the Neurogenetics and Behavior section of the Genetics Society of America flagship scientific publication Genetics.
