= Genes, Brain and Behavior =

- Discipline: Neuroscience, genetics, behavioral sciences, psychiatry
- Language: English
- Edited by: Andrew Holmes

Publication details
- History: 2002–present
- Publisher: Wiley
- Frequency: Bimonthly
- Open access: Yes
- License: CC BY-NC-ND, and up
- Impact factor: 2.4 (2023)

Standard abbreviations
- ISO 4: Genes Brain Behav.

Indexing
- CODEN: GBBEAO
- ISSN: 1601-1848 (print); 1601-183X (web)
- LCCN: 2002243177
- OCLC no.: 49420026

Links
- Journal homepage; Online access; Online archive

Genes, Brain and Behavior (also known as G2B) is a bimonthly peer-reviewed open access scientific journal covering research in the fields of behavioral, neural, and psychiatric genetics. It is published by Wiley on behalf of the International Behavioural and Neural Genetics Society. The journal was established in 2002 as a quarterly and is currently published bimonthly. In 2024, Douglas Wahlsten wrote that the contents of the journal are "thoroughly modern", not suffering from the genetic determinism that "infected" many earlier behavior-genetics publications.

== Overview and history ==
Genes, Brain and Behavior (also known as G2B) is published by Wiley on behalf of the International Behavioural and Neural Genetics Society. Volume 1 appeared in 2002 and issues appeared quarterly. As submissions increased, the journal switched in 2003 to a bimonthly schedule, in 2006 to 8-times-a-year, and going back to bimonthly in 2023. Review time from submission to first editorial decision is just a month with a "remarkably fast 2 days from acceptance of a paper to on-line publication." Content is available online for free from the Wiley Online Library. The journal was originally published in both print and electronic versions, but since 2014 the journal is online-only. Publication costs are covered through article publication charges paid by authors or their institutions (Gold open access).

The founding editor-in-chief was Wim Crusio (French National Centre for Scientific Research), who was succeeded in 2012 by Andrew Holmes (National Institute on Alcohol Abuse and Alcoholism).

== Reception ==
In its third year, Genes, Brain and Behavior was available in 1400 academic libraries. In 2024, Douglas Wahlsten wrote that the contents of the journal are "thoroughly modern", not suffering from the genetic determinism that "infected" many earlier behavior-genetics publications.

According to the Journal Citation Reports, its 2023 impact factor is 2.4, ranking the journal 195th out of 310 journals in the category "Neurosciences" and 24th out of 55 journals in the category "Behavioral Sciences". The five journals that as of 2023 have cited Genes, Brain and Behavior most often, are (in order of descending citation frequency) International Journal of Molecular Sciences, Scientific Reports, Frontiers in Neuroscience, Neuroscience & Biobehavioral Reviews, and Frontiers in Behavioral Neuroscience. As of 2023, the five journals that have been cited most frequently by articles published in Genes, Brain and Behavior are Alcoholism: Clinical and Experimental Research, Molecular Psychiatry, Nature Genetics, The Journal of Neuroscience, and Behavioural Brain Research.

The journal has developed standards for the publication of mouse mutant studies. Many mouse mutant studies have serious methodological problems leading to fatally flawed scientific conclusions, causing a waste of time, effort, and research resources, and leading to ethical problems because of the unnecessary use of live animals for flawed studies. These standards are gradually being accepted more widely in the field.

== Abstracting and indexing ==
Genes, Brain and Behavior is abstracted and indexed in:

- Biological Abstracts
- BIOSIS Previews
- EBSCO databases
- Embase
- Index Medicus/MEDLINE/PubMed
- ProQuest databases
- PsycINFO
- Science Citation Index Expanded
- Scopus

== Most cited articles ==
According to the Web of Science, the following three articles have been cited most often (>600 times):

1. Rubenstein JL, Merzenich MM (2003). "Model of autism: increased ratio of excitation/inhibition in key neural systems". Genes, Brain and Behavior. 2 (5): 255–67. doi:10.1034/j.1601-183X.2003.00037.x. PMC 6748642. PMID 14606691.
2. Moy, SS; Nadler, JJ; Perez, A; Barbaro, RP; Johns, JM; Magnuson, TR; Piven, J; Crawley, JN (2004). "Sociability and preference for social novelty in five inbred strains: An approach to assess autistic-like behavior in mice". Genes, Brain and Behavior. 3 (5): 287–302. doi:10.1111/j.1601-1848.2004.00076.x. PMID 15344922.
3. McFarlane, H. G.; Kusek, G. K.; Yang, M.; Phoenix, J. L.; Bolivar, V. J.; Crawley, J. N. (March 2008). "Autism-like behavioral phenotypes in BTBR T+tf/J mice". Genes, Brain and Behavior. 7 (2): 152–163. doi:10.1111/j.1601-183X.2007.00330.x. PMID 17559418.

== See also ==
- Behavior Genetics
- Journal of Neurogenetics
- Neurogenetics
- Psychiatric Genetics
- Twin Research and Human Genetics
