= John Crabbe =

John Crabbe may refer to:

- John Crabbe (footballer), English footballer and manager
- John Crabbe (died 1352), Flemish merchant, pirate and soldier
- John C. Crabbe, American neuroscientist and behavior geneticist
