= Hans van Abeelen =

Dutch behaviour geneticist

Johannes Henricus Felix van Abeelen
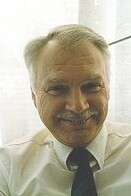
- Born: 20 November 1936; Enschede, Netherlands
- Died: 21 August 1998 (aged 61); Enschede, Netherlands
- Citizenship: Dutch
- Education: Radboud University Nijmegen
- Scientific career
- Fields: Behavioural genetics
- Institutions: Radboud University Nijmegen
- Thesis: An Ethological Investigation of Single-Gene Differences in Mice (1965)
- Doctoral advisor: S.J. Geerts
- Notable students: Wim Crusio

Hans van Abeelen (20 November 1936 – 21 August 1998) was the first Dutch behaviour geneticist. He obtained his M.Sc from the University of Groningen and his Ph.D. from the Catholic University of Nijmegen in 1965, where he stayed for the rest of his career as "wetenschappelijk hoofdmedewerker". He was a founding member of the Behavior Genetics Association and was a member-at-large of its executive committee from 1984 till 1987. He also served on the editorial board of its journal, Behavior Genetics, from its creation in 1971 to 1992. Van Abeelen took early retirement in 1991, but nevertheless became one of the founding members of the International Behavioural and Neural Genetics Society. Over the span of his career, he published 64 articles and book chapters and edited a book, The Genetics of Behaviour, which was an early overview of European behaviour genetics.

== Notable publications ==
- van Abeelen, J. H. F. (September 1989). "Genetic control of hippocampal cholinergic and dynorphinergic mechanisms regulating novelty-induced exploratory behavior in house mice". Experientia. 45 (9): 839–45. doi:10.1007/BF01954058. PMID 2570714. S2CID 13214764.
- van Abeelen, J. H. F. (1964). "Mouse mutants studied by means of ethological methods". Genetica. 34: 79–94. doi:10.1007/BF01664181. S2CID 44915853.
- van Abeelen, J. H. F. (1966). "Effects of genotype on mouse behaviour". Animal Behaviour. 14 (2): 218–25. doi:10.1016/S0003-3472(66)80075-1. PMID 6006025.
