= Terje Sagvolden =

Norwegian behavioral neuroscientist (1945–2011)

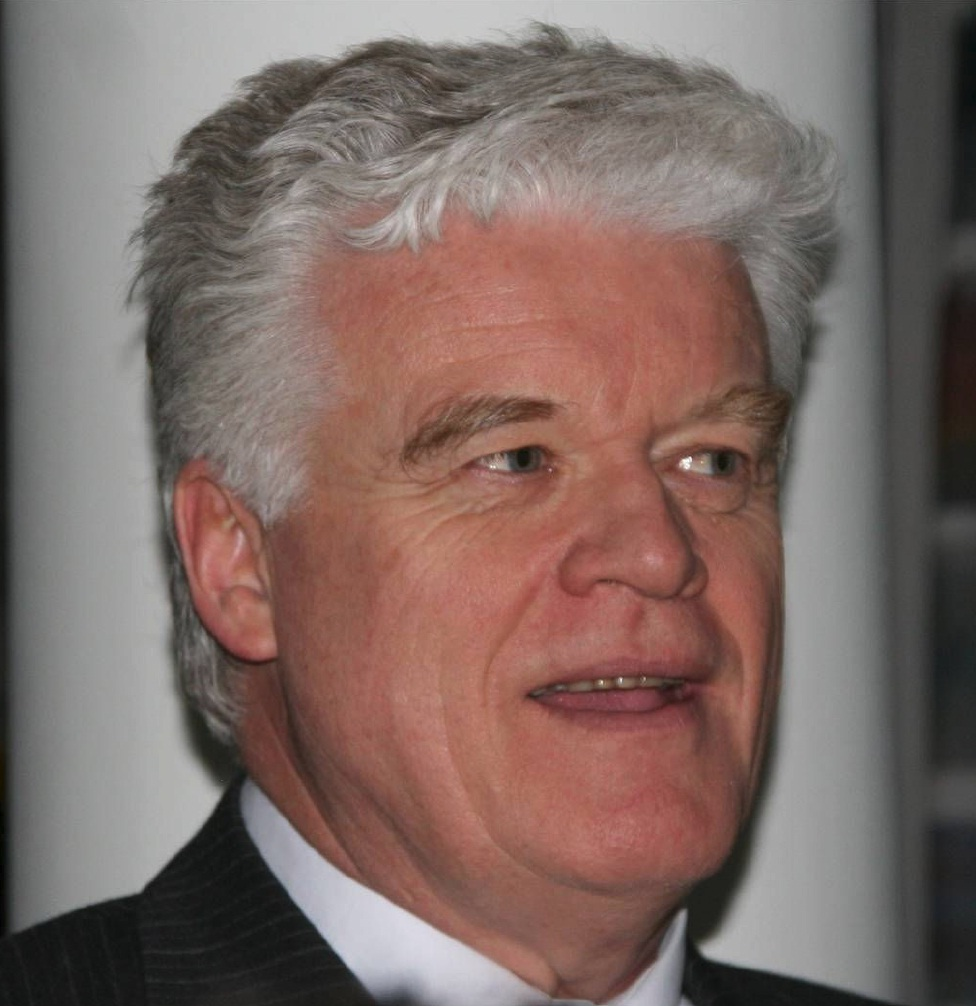
- Born: 12 February 1945
- Died: 12 January 2011 (aged 65); Oslo, Norway
- Citizenship: Norway
- Education: University of Oslo
- Known for: Research on animal models of ADHD
- Scientific career
- Fields: Behavioral neuroscience

Terje Sagvolden (12 February 1945 – 12 January 2011, Oslo) was a Norwegian behavioral neuroscientist, a professor at the Universities of Oslo and Tromsø, and adjunct professor at the University of Maryland, Baltimore County.

== Research ==
Sagvolden's research career started with his work for his PhD, which he obtained in 1979 from the University of Oslo based on a thesis entitled Behavioral Changes in Rats with Septal Lesions: Effects of Water-Deprivation Level and Intensity of Electrical Shocks. Sagvolden is best known for the discovery that the SHR rat strain is hyperactive. Over the next decades, he then went on to demonstrate that this strain is a valid animal model for attention deficit hyperactivity disorder (ADHD). Subsequently, Sagvolden also showed that the WKY/NCrl rat strain showed inattention, but no impulsivity or hyperactivity, and validated this strain as an animal model of inattentive ADHD. Over the course of his career, Sagvolden worked not only with rats, but also with humans and pigeons.

== Editorial activities ==
Sagvolden was the founding editor-in-chief of the scientific journal Behavioral and Brain Functions, from the time of its establishment in 2005 to his death in 2011. In 1989 he co-edited, together with Trevor Archer, a book summarizing current research on ADHD, followed in 1998 by a special issue on ADHD for Behavioural Brain Research.

== Community service ==
Sagvolden was a member at large of the executive committee of the European Brain and Behaviour Society from 1986 to 1989 and its secretary from 1990 to 1995. Over the last two decades of his life, he was an active supporter of the Society of Neuroscientists of Africa (SONA) and in 1993 played a significant role in its founding. He was subsequently member of SONA's International Advisory Committee and an official internal adviser from 1999 to 2004. In 2000, Sagvolden organized the first IBRO school in Africa at the University of the North (Pietersburg, South Africa). In addition, Sagvolden was one of the "founding fathers" of the Federation of European Neuroscience Societies, where he represented Norway on the council from the foundation of the federation until his death.

Outside of the scientific community, Sagvolden was also active in local politics. He was a member of the Lier municipal council for the Conservative Municipal Group from 2003 until his death, and served in the areas of health, culture, childhood, education. In 2003, he was one of the top five candidates to run for mayor.

== Notable works ==
According to the Web of Science, Sagvolden published over 103 articles in peer-reviewed scientific journals. As of January 2014, these articles have been cited over 3400 times, resulting in an h-index of 30. His three most-cited publications (> 185 times) are:

- Sagvolden T, Johansen EB, Aase H, Russell VA (June 2005). "A dynamic developmental theory of attention-deficit/hyperactivity disorder (ADHD) predominantly hyperactive/impulsive and combined subtypes". The Behavioral and Brain Sciences. 28 (3): 397–419, discussion 419–68. doi:10.1017/S0140525X05000075. PMID 16209748.
- Sagvolden T (January 2000). "Behavioral validation of the spontaneously hypertensive rat (SHR) as an animal model of attention-deficit/hyperactivity disorder (AD/HD)". Neuroscience and Biobehavioral Reviews. 24 (1): 31–9. doi:10.1016/S0149-7634(99)00058-5. PMID 10654658. S2CID 23286997.
- Sagvolden T, Sergeant JA (July 1998). "Attention deficit/hyperactivity disorder--from brain dysfunctions to behaviour". Behavioural Brain Research. 94 (1): 1–10. doi:10.1016/S0166-4328(97)00164-2. PMID 9708834. S2CID 208792456.
