= Journal of Neurogenetics =

- Discipline: Neurogenetics
- Language: English
- Edited by: Chun-Fang Wu

Publication details
- History: Since 1983
- Publisher: Taylor & Francis
- Frequency: Quarterly
- Impact factor: 1.1 (2025)

Standard abbreviations
- ISO 4: J. Neurogenet.

Indexing
- CODEN: JLNEDK
- ISSN: 0167-7063 (print); 1563-5260 (web)
- LCCN: 91640770
- OCLC no.: 10004179

Links
- Journal homepage; Online access; Online archive; Journal page at publisher's website

The Journal of Neurogenetics is a quarterly peer-reviewed scientific journal that covers all aspects of neurogenetics. It is published by Taylor & Francis and the editor-in-chief is Chun-Fang Wu (University of Iowa).

== Abstracting and indexing ==
The journal is abstracted and indexed in:

- Aquatic Sciences and Fisheries Abstracts
- Biological Abstracts
- BIOSIS Previews
- Chemical Abstracts Service
- Elsevier Biobase
- Embase
- Index Medicus/MEDLINE/PubMed
- PsycINFO
- Science Citation Index Expanded
- Scopus

According to the Journal Citation Reports, the journal has a 2025 impact factor of 1.1.

== See also ==
- Behavior Genetics
- Genes, Brain and Behavior
- Molecular Psychiatry
- Neurogenetics
- Psychiatric Genetics
