= Jacob Biamonte =

American mathematical physicist (born 1979)

Jacob Daniel Biamonte FInstP
- Born: January 22, 1979 (age 47); Lancaster, New Hampshire, United States
- Education: University of Oxford; Moscow Institute of Physics and Technology
- Known for: Adiabatic quantum computation, Variational quantum algorithms, Quantum machine learning
- Awards: USERN Medal (2018); Fellow IMA (2021); Fellow of the Institute of Physics (2023)
- Scientific career
- Fields: Quantum computing Tensor networks Mathematical physics
- Workplaces: École de technologie supérieure (ÉTS), Université du Québec
- Website: https://profs.etsmtl.ca/jbiamonte/

Jacob Daniel Biamonte FInstP is an American physicist and computer scientist working in quantum information theory and quantum computing. He is a professor in the Université du Québec system at the École de technologie supérieure (ÉTS), where he holds the Quebec Ministry (MEIE) Principal Research Chair in Quantum Computing.

Biamonte is known for contributions to the theory of quantum computation, including results on universal models of adiabatic quantum computation and the universality of variational quantum computation. His work also includes contributions to quantum machine learning and the development of graphical and tensor-network formalisms for quantum computation.

== Research ==
Biamonte's research concerns the mathematical and physical structure of quantum computation, with results identifying universal computational models and their limitations. His work addresses how quantum processes are represented and compared, including graphical and categorical formalisms for quantum circuits and tensor networks, quantum simulation of physical systems, and information-theoretic analysis of quantum dynamics on complex networks.

His early work established the experimentally relevant universal models of adiabatic quantum computation by proving the QMA-completeness of sparse, physically realizable Hamiltonians, helping clarify the relationship between ground state physics and computational universality.

He later proved that feed-forward variational quantum algorithms can efficiently simulate universal quantum computation, establishing the variational model as computationally universal in the fault-tolerant setting. Related work analyzed limitations of variational training, including reachability deficits, parameter concentration and training saturation effects. In terms of circuit training, Biamonte has also contributed to the development of quantum machine learning, helping to connect quantum algorithms, learning theory and data-driven applications.

Another major theme in his work is tensor network theory. He developed tensor-network formulations of Boolean satisfiability and counting problems, showing how computational complexity can be analyzed through tensor contraction structure and graphical methods. He also developed categorical and graphical tensor-network formalisms extending diagrammatic representations of quantum circuits to higher-dimensional systems, including qudits, and establishing algebraic normal forms for quantum states and processes.

In addition to foundational models, Biamonte has contributed to quantum algorithms for the simulation of physical systems. His work on the computational complexity of electronic-structure simulation helped clarify resource requirements for quantum chemistry and materials applications.

More broadly, his research links mathematical physics, theoretical computer science and quantum information through algebraic, graphical and computational representations of quantum processes.

== Education ==
Biamonte received a Ph.D. in Computer Science from the University of Oxford in 2010. In 2022, he defended a Doctor of Physical and Mathematical Sciences (D.Sc.) dissertation in Mathematical Physics at the Moscow Institute of Physics and Technology.

== Honors and awards ==
Biamonte was awarded the USERN Medal in Formal Sciences in 2018. He was elected a Fellow of the Institute of Physics in 2023.
