= Cognitive genomics =

Cognitive genomics (or neurative genomics) is the sub-field of genomics pertaining to cognitive function in which the genes and non-coding sequences of an organism's genome related to the health and activity of the brain are studied. By applying comparative genomics, the genomes of multiple species are compared in order to identify genetic and phenotypical differences between species. Observed phenotypical characteristics related to the neurological function include behavior, personality, neuroanatomy, and neuropathology. The theory behind cognitive genomics is based on elements of genetics, evolutionary biology, molecular biology, cognitive psychology, behavioral psychology, and neurophysiology.

Intelligence is the most extensively studied behavioral trait. In humans, approximately 70% of all genes are expressed in the brain. Genetic variation accounts for 40% of phenotypical variation. Approaches in cognitive genomics have been used to investigate the genetic causes for many mental and neurodegenerative disorders including Down syndrome, major depressive disorder, autism, and Alzheimer's disease.

== Cognitive genomics testing ==
=== Approaches ===
==== Evo-geno ====
The most commonly used approach to genome-investigation is evolutionary genomics biology, or evo-geno, in which the genomes of two species which share a common ancestor are compared. A common example of evo-geno is comparative cognitive genomics testing between humans and chimpanzees which shared an ancestor 6-7 million years ago. Patterns in local gene expression and gene splicing are examined to determine genomic differentiation. Comparative transcriptomic analyses conducted on primate brains to measure gene expression levels have shown significant differences between human and chimpanzee genomes. The evo-geno approach was also used to verify the theory that humans and non-human primates share similar expression levels in energy metabolism-related genes which have implications for aging and neurodegenerative disease.

==== Evo-devo ====
The evolutionary developmental biology (evo-devo) approach compares cognitive and neuroanatomic development patterns between sets of species. Studies of human fetus brains reveal that almost a third of expressed genes are regionally differentiated, far more than non-human species. This finding could potentially explain variations in cognitive development between individuals. Neuroanatomical evo-devo studies have connected higher brain order to brain lateralization which, though present in other species, is highly ordered in humans.

==== Evo-pheno and evo-patho ====
Evolutionary phenotype biology (evo-pheno) approach examines phenotype expression between species. Evolutionary pathology biology (evo-patho) approach investigates disease prevalence between species.

=== Imaging genomics ===
==== Candidate gene selection ====
In genomics, a gene being imaged and analyzed is referred to as a candidate gene. The ideal candidate genes for comparative genomic testing are genes that harbor well-defined functional polymorphisms with known effects on neuroanatomical and/or cognitive function. However, genes with either identified single-nucleotide polymorphisms or allele variations with potential functional implications on neuroanatomical systems suffice. The weaker the connection between the gene and the phenotype, the more difficult it is to establish causality through testing.

==== Controlling for non-genetic factors ====
Non-genetic factors such as age, illness, injury, or substance abuse can have significant effects on gene expression and phenotypic variance. The identification and contribution of genetic variation to specific phenotypes can only be performed when other potential contributing factors can be matched across genotype groups. In the case of neuroimaging during task performance such as in fMRI, groups are matched by performance level. Non-genetic factors have a particularly large potential effect on cognitive development. In the case of autism, non-genetic factors account for 62% of disease risk.

==== Task selection ====
In order to study the connection between a candidate gene and a proposed phenotype, a subject is often given a task to perform that elicits the behavioral phenotype while undergoing some form of neuroimaging. Many behavioral tasks used for genomic studies are modified versions of classic behavioral and neuropsychological tests designed to investigate neural systems critical to particular behaviors.

== Species used in comparative cognitive genomics ==
=== Humans ===
In 2003, the Human Genome Project produced the first complete human genome. Despite the project's success, very little is known about cognitive gene expression. Prior to 2003, any evidence concerning human brain connectivity was based on post-mortem observations. Due to ethical concerns, no invasive in vivo genomics studies have been performed on live humans.

=== Non-human primates ===
As the closest genetic relatives to humans, non-human primates are the most preferable genomics imaging subjects. In most cases, primates are imaged while under anesthesia. Due to the high cost of raising and maintaining primate populations, genomic testing on non-human primates is typically performed at primate research facilities.

==== Chimpanzees ====
Chimpanzees (Pan troglodytes) are the closest genetic relatives to humans, sharing 93.6% genetic similarity. It is believed that humans and chimpanzees shared a common genetic ancestor around 7 million years ago. The movement to sequence the chimpanzee genome began in 1998 and was given high priority by the US National Institutes of Health (NIH).

Currently, human and chimpanzees have the only sequenced genomes in the extended family of primates. Some comparisons of autosomal intergenic non-repetitive DNA segments suggest as little as 1.24% genetic difference between humans and chimpanzees along certain sections. Despite the genetic similarity, 80% of proteins between the two species are different which understates the clear phenotypical differences.

==== Rhesus macaques ====
Rhesus macaques (Macaca mulatta) exhibit a 93% genetic similarity to humans approximately. They are often used as an out-group in human/chimpanzee genomic studies. Humans and rhesus macaques shared a common ancestor an estimated 25 million years ago.

==== Apes ====
Orangutans (Pongo pygmaeus) and gorillas (Gorilla gorilla) have been used in genomics testing but are not common subjects due to cost.

== Neurobehavioral and cognitive disorders ==
Despite what is sometimes reported, most behavioral or pathological phenotypes are not due to a single gene mutation but rather a complex genetic basis. However, there are some exceptions to this rule such as Huntington's disease which is caused by a single specific genetic disorder. The occurrence of neurobehavioral disorders is influenced by a number of factors, genetic and non-genetic.

=== Down syndrome ===
Down syndrome is a genetic syndrome marked by intellectual disability and distinct cranio-facial features and occurs in approximately 1 in 800 live births. Experts believe the genetic cause for the syndrome is a lack of genes in the 21st chromosome. However, the gene or genes responsible for the cognitive phenotype have yet to be discovered.

=== Fragile-X syndrome ===
Fragile-X syndrome is caused by a mutation of the FRAXA gene located in the X chromosome. The syndrome is marked by intellectual disability (moderate in males, mild in females), language deficiency, and some autistic spectrum behaviors.

=== Alzheimer's disease ===
Alzheimer's disease is a neurodegenerative disorder that causes age-correlated progressive cognitive decline. animal model using mice have investigated the pathophysiology and suggest possible treatments such as immunization with amyloid beta and peripheral administration of antibodies against amyloid beta. Studies have linked Alzheimer's with gene alterations causing SAMP8 protein abnormalities.

=== Autism ===
Autism is a pervasive developmental disorder characterized by abnormal social development, inability to empathize and effectively communicate, and restricted patterns of interest. A possible neuroanatomical cause is the presence of tubers in the temporal lobe. As mentioned previously, non-genetic factors account for 62% of autism development risk. Autism is a human-specific disorder. As such, the genetic cause has been implicated to highly ordered brain lateralization exhibited by humans. Two genes have been linked to autism and autism spectrum disorders (ASD): c3orf58 (a.k.a. Deleted In Autism-1 or DIA1) and cXorf36 (a.k.a.Deleted in Autism-1 Related or DIA1R).

=== Major depressive disorder ===
Major depressive disorder is a common mood disorder believed to be caused by irregular neural uptake of serotonin. While the genetic cause is unknown, genomic studies of post-mortem MDD brains have discovered abnormalities in the fibroblast growth factor system which supports the theory of growth factors playing an important role in mood disorders.

=== Others ===
Other neurodegenerative disorders include Rett syndrome, Prader–Willi syndrome, Angelman syndrome, and Williams-Beuren syndrome.

== See also ==
- Neurogenetics
- Comparative genomics
- Cognitive psychology
- Behavioral genetics
- Neuroanatomy
- Heritability of IQ
