= Jacqueline Crawley =

American behavioral neuroscientist

Jacqueline N. Crawley
- Education: University of Pennsylvania
- Known for: What's Wrong with my Mouse
- Awards: Marjorie A. Myers Lifetime Achievement Award (International Behavioral Neuroscience Society), Distinguished Scientist Award (International Behavioural and Neural Genetics Society)
- Scientific career
- Fields: Behavior genetics, behavioral neuroscience, behavioral pharmacology
- Workplaces: National Institute of Mental Health, University of California, Davis
- Doctoral advisor: Wolfgang Schleidt, Joseph Contrera

Jacqueline N. Crawley (née Lerner) is an American behavioral neuroscientist and an expert on rodent behavioral analysis. Since July 2012, she is the Robert E. Chason Chair in Translational Research in the MIND Institute and professor of psychiatry and behavioral sciences at the University of California, Davis School of Medicine in Sacramento. Previously, from 1983–2012, she was chief of the Laboratory of Behavioral Neuroscience in the intramural program of the National Institute of Mental Health. Her translational research program focuses on testing hypotheses about the genetic causes of autism spectrum disorders and discovering treatments for the diagnostic symptoms of autism, using mouse models. She has published more than 275 peer-reviewed articles in scientific journals and 110 review articles and book chapters. According to Scopus, her works have been cited over 36,000 times, giving her an h-index of 99. She has co-edited 4 books and is the author of What's Wrong With my Mouse? Behavioral Phenotyping of Transgenic and Knockout Mice (1st edition 2000, 2nd edition 2007, ISBN 978-0-471-47192-9), which was very well received.

== Education ==
Crawley obtained her B.A. in biology from the University of Pennsylvania in 1971 and her PhD in 1976 from the University of Maryland, College Park. She then did postdoctoral research in neuropsychopharmacology at the Yale School of Medicine (1976-1979).

== Behavioral test development ==
Crawley is at the origin of several widely employed tests used to evaluate, for example, anxiety-related and social behavior in rodents, especially mice. Early in her career, she developed the light-dark mouse exploration test, and showed that it is a valid test for anxiety-like behaviors. More recently, she developed the three-chamber social approach assay to evaluate mouse social behavior.

== Honors ==
Crawley has been president of the International Behavioral Neuroscience Society (2000-2001), the International Behavioural and Neural Genetics Society (2008-2011), and chair of the American Association for the Advancement of Science Neuroscience Section (2018-2019). She has been editor-in-chief of Neuropeptides, associate editor of Molecular Autism and Current Protocols in Neuroscience, and member of several editorial boards, among them Autism Research, Genes, Brain and Behavior, and Trends in Pharmacological Sciences. In 2011, Crawley received the IBANGS Distinguished Investigator Award, which "recognizes the contributions of a senior scientist to the field, considering research, mentorship, and continued impact on the field". In recognition of the contributions of her late husband and Crawley herself, the MIND institute established the "Barry Wolfe and Jacqueline Crawley Travel Award for MIND Institute Postdoctoral Fellows".
