= USERN =

Acronym for Universal Scientific Education Research Network

Universal Scientific Education and Research Network (USERN)
- Website type: Scientific Network
- Founder: Nima Rezaei
- President: Tommaso Dorigo
- Website: usern.org
- Launched: January 2016

The Universal Scientific Education and Research Network (official acronym – USERN) is a non-profit organization and network for non-military scientific investigation and policy-making. USERN was established on January 1, 2016, and the basic statutes of USERN were drafted on January 21, 2015. The official inauguration of the statutes was held on November 10, 2016, the UN Day of Science for Peace and Development.

USERN is an organization dedicated to promoting ethical and professional scientific research and education, as well as advancing science for non-military purposes.

== Membership ==
USERN began its official activity in early 2016, and following the first meeting, has encouraged individuals to become members via the USERN website. However, the USERN website has been criticized for its functionality, as users have frequently experienced difficulties logging in, changing their passwords, or modifying their pages.

== USERN Prize ==
The USERN Prize is an international award annually bestowed to junior scientists or researchers less than 40 years of age for any novel advancement or achievement in scientific education, research, or serving humanity in five scientific fields including medical sciences, life sciences, formal sciences, physical sciences, and social sciences.

=== USERN Prize Awarding Festival ===
The closing day of congress and awarding the international rewards ceremony of USERN, the universal scientific education and research network prize or USERN prize will be awarded in 10 November the World Science Day for Peace and Development to 5 young scholars under 40 ages in different theoretical sciences (Mathematics and Computer), Physics sciences (Physics, Chemistry, Engineering), Environmental Sciences, Medical Sciences, and Social Sciences.

==== USERN Laureates 2016 ====
Floris De Lange (Netherlands) in Social Sciences

For: Expectation sharpens the visual response

Alexander Leemans (Belgium/Netherlands) in Medical Sciences

For: Processing and Visualization in Diffusion Imaging

Jamshid Aghaei (Iran) in Physical Sciences

For: Evaluating Technical Benefits and Risks of Renewable Energy Sources Increasing Penetration in Electrical Networks

Morteza Mahmoudi (Iran/USA) in Biological Sciences

For: Defining the Biological Identity of Nanotherapeutics for High Yield Cancer Therapy

Lucas Joppa (USA) in Formal Sciences

For: Technology for Nature

== The Second International USERN Congress ==
The 2nd international USERN congress was held in Kharkiv, Ukraine on 8 to 10 November 2017.

=== USERN Laureates 2017 ===
Matjaž Perc (Slovenia) in Social Sciences

For: Transitions Towards Cooperation in Human Societies

Lucina Qazi Uddin (USA) in Medical Sciences

For: Brain Dynamics and Flexible Behavior in Autism and Attention-Deficit/Hyperactivity

Maria-Magdalena Titirici (UK) in Physical Sciences

For: The Design of Efficient and Low Cost Electrocatalysts Catalysts Without the Use of Critical Metals

Valentina Cauda (Italy) in Biological Sciences

For: Hybrid Immune-Eluding Nanocrystals as Smart and Active Theranostic Weapons Against Cancer -TrojaNanoHorse

Manlio De Domenico (Italy) in Formal Sciences

For: Multilayer Structure and Dynamics of the Physical World: Modeling the Complexity of Systems of Systems

== The Third International USERN Congress ==
The 3rd international USERN congress was held in Reggio Calabria, Italy on 10 to 14 November 2018.

=== USERN Laureates 2018 ===
Igor Grossmann (Canada) in Social Sciences

For: Wisdom - Towards The Social and Behavioral Science of Sound Judgment

Gian Paolo Fadini (Italy) in Medical Sciences

For: Circulating Stem Cells in Diabetic Complications (Remediation)

Alex Fornito (Australia) in Biological Sciences

For: Maps, Models, and Modifiers of Brain Changes in Psychosis

Xavier Moya (UK) in Physical Sciences

For: Barocaloric Materials for Environment-Friendly Solid -State Refrigeration

Jacob Biamonte (Russia) in Formal Sciences

For: Quantum Enhanced Machine Learning

== The Fourth International USERN Congress ==
The 4th international USERN congress was held in Budapest, Hungary on 8 to 10 November 2019.

=== USERN Laureates 2019 ===
Benjamin Sovacool (Denmark, UK) in Social Sciences

For: Social Justice in an Era of Climate Change and Energy Scarcity

Eugenia Morselli (Chile) in Medical Sciences

For: Mechanisms of Hypothalamic Autophagy in Obesity

Ajeet Kaushik (USA) in Biological Sciences

For: Nano-Bio-Technology for Personalized Health Care

Giulia Grancini (Switzerland, Italy) in Physical-Chemical Sciences

For: Multi-Dimensional Ferroelectric Hybrid Perovskites for Advanced Optoelectronics

Lucas Lacasa (UK) in Formal Sciences

For: Bridging sIgnal Processing and NETwork science (BIPNET

== The Fifth International USERN Congress ==
The 5th international USERN congress was held in Tehran, Iran on 7 to 10 November 2020.

=== USERN Laureates 2020 ===
Lianne Schamaal (Australia) in Social Sciences

For: A Global Alliance to Elucidate Neurobiological Signatures of Depression and Suicide

Mohammad Ali Shahbazi (Finland) in Medical Sciences

For: A Thermo-responsive Biopolymeric Micro-implant for the Treatment of Autoimmune Disorders

Daniel Sauter (Germany) in Biological Sciences

For: Deciphering Molecular Determinants of Coronavirus Spread in the Human Population

Gregory Mark Allen Ashton (Australia) in Physical and Chemical Sciences

For: Black Holes and Neutron Stars: Enabling Astrophysics with Bilb y

Dongrui Wu (China) in Formal Sciences

For: Signal Processing and Machine Learning for Calibration-free and Secure Brain-Computer Interfaces (BCIs)

== The sixth International USERN Congress ==
The 6th international USERN congress was held in Istanbul, Turkey on 6 to 13 November 2021.

=== USERN Laureates 2021 ===
Xudong Zhao (China) in Formal Sciences

For: Control synthesis of switched systems

Minghao Yu (Germany) in Physical and Chemical Sciences

For: Developing sustainable energy storage devices with resource-abundant raw materials

Federico Bella (Italy) in Biological Sciences

For: From air to fertilizers: zero-impact agriculture of the future

Hassan Abolhassani (Sweden) in Medical Sciences

For: Integrative Multi-Omics Analysis of Unsolved Inborn Errors of Immunity

Daniel King (Australia) in Social Sciences

For: Empowering vulnerable populations to overcome unhealthy gaming habits and gaming disorder

== The seventh International USERN Congress ==
The 7th international USERN congress was held in Muscat, Oman on 8 to10 November 2022.

=== USERN Laureates 2022 ===
Fabien Lotte (France) in Formal Sciences

For: BrainConquest: Boosting Brain-Computer Communication with high Quality User Training, for Healthy and Motor-Impaired Users alike

Mirjana Dimitrievska (Switzerland) in Physical and Chemical Sciences

For: SMARTCELL - Sustainable Materials for development of Advanced Renewable Technologies for the Next Generation Solar CELLs

Jianing Fu (USA) in Biological Sciences

For: Functional Profile, Migration Pattern and Microenvironment of Human Hematopoietic Stem Cells in Ectopic Organs in Physiological and Inflammatory Conditions

Sara De Biasi (Italy) in Medical Sciences

For: Unravelling the Role of MHC Class I–related Molecule–restricted T cells on Response to Anti-PD-1 Therapy in Metastatic Melanoma

Joseph Firth (England) in Social Sciences

For: Implementing Lifestyle Medicine into Youth Mental Healthcare: Improving Physical and Mental Health Outcomes in Young People

== The eighth International USERN Congress ==
The 8th international USERN congress was held in Yerevan, Armenia on 8 to 10 Nov 2023.

=== USERN Laureates 2023 ===
Navid Akhtar (Australia) in Formal Sciences

For: Enabling transparent and trustworthy Artificial Intelligence

Hialiang Wang (USA) in Physical and Chemical Sciences

For: Advancing Molecular Electrocatalysis for Renewable Energy Storage and Environmental Remediation

Prashant Kesharwani (India) in Biological Sciences

For: Survivin targeted siRNA using cancer selective nanoparticles for triple negative breast cancer therapy

Hao Chen (China) in Medical Sciences

For: A tunable microgel with sustained hierarchy releasing of macrobiotics for the treatment of enteritis

Katrien Fransen (Belgium) in Social Sciences

For: From autocracy to empowerment: Harnessing the human potential for improved team effectiveness and enhanced well-being across cultures.

== The ninth International USERN Congress ==
The 9th international USERN congress and prize awarding festival was held in Plovdiv, Bulgaria on 8 to 10 Nov 2024.

=== USERN Laureates 2024 ===
Andrea Luppi (UK) in Formal Sciences

For: Synergistic information across artificial and biological intelligence

Dongliang Chao (China) in Physical and Chemical Sciences

For: Finding safe, low-cost, and scalable aqueous battery technologies and its practical applications

Tiziana Cappello (Italy) in Biological Sciences

For: EMBRYotoxicity tests and integrative multi-biomarkers and -OMICS to unveil the impact of microplastics and associated contaminants - EMBRYOMICS

Fabiana Corsi-Zuelli (Brazil) in Medical Sciences

For: Peripheral blood immune signatures of psychosis; testing the regulatory T cell hypothesis

Ewa Szumowska (Poland) in Social Sciences

For: Research program aimed at understanding proneness to extremism

== The tenth International USERN Congress ==
The 10th international USERN congress and prize awarding festival was held in Campinas, Sao Paulo, Brazil on 8 to 10 Nov 2025.

=== USERN Laureates 2025 ===
Dong Keon Yon (South Korea) in Formal Sciences

For: Synergistic information across artificial and biological intelligence

Hasan Oğul (Turkey) in Physical and Chemical Sciences

For: Development of Radiation shielding materials for Small Modular Nuclear Reactors

Anton Tkachenko (Czech Republic) in Biological Sciences

For: Eryptosis as a promising approach to assess hemocompatibility of nanomaterials

Yunlu Dai (Macao) in Medical Sciences

For: Rapid construction of efficient polypeptide tumor vaccine based on topo-engineered self-adjuvanting OMV

Beata Bothe (Canada) in Social Sciences

For: International Sex Survey (ISS)

== The eleventh International USERN Congress ==
The 11th international USERN congress and prize awarding festival was held in Astana, Kazakhstan on 8 to 10 Nov 2026.

=== USERN Laureates 2026 ===
Deepika Saxena (Japan) in Formal Sciences

For: Quantum Federated Learning-driven Secure Industry Cloud Collaboration Framework

Esther Bailon Garcia (Spain) in Physical and Chemical Sciences

For: Carbon Quantum Dot-Based 3D-Printed Diffuser Electrodes for Coupled Photo-Assisted CO₂ Reduction and Hydrogen Evolution

Maxat Zhabagin (Kazakhstan) in Biological Sciences

For: From Ancient Genomes to Precision Medicine: Reconstructing Human Diversity and Evolution Across Inner Eurasia

Giacomo Valle (Sweden) in Medical Sciences

For: Brain-controlled bionic limbs for paralyzed individuals: restoring touch through a brain interface

Yuan-Wei Yao (Hong Kong) in Social Sciences

For: Understanding Problematic Social Media Use Through a Computational Psychiatry Approach: Behavioral Dynamics, Neural Mechanisms, and Intervention Effects

== USERN Offices Worldwide ==
Since the beginning of its establishment, and in order to promote universal scientific education and research, USERN has signed several Memorandum of Understanding (MOUs) and established several offices in scientific research centers and universities worldwide.

== USERN Executive Directors ==
- Dr. Sanam Ladi Seyedian (2016-2017)
- Dr. Arya Aminorroaya, Dr. Sara Hanaei, Dr. Mahsa Keshavarz-Fathi (2018)
- Dr. Farnaz Delavari (2019)
- Dr. Saboura Ashkevarian (2020)
- Dr. Heliya Ziaei (2021-2022)
- Dr. Niloufar Yazdanpanah (2022-current)

== See also ==
- Nima Rezaei

== Gallery ==
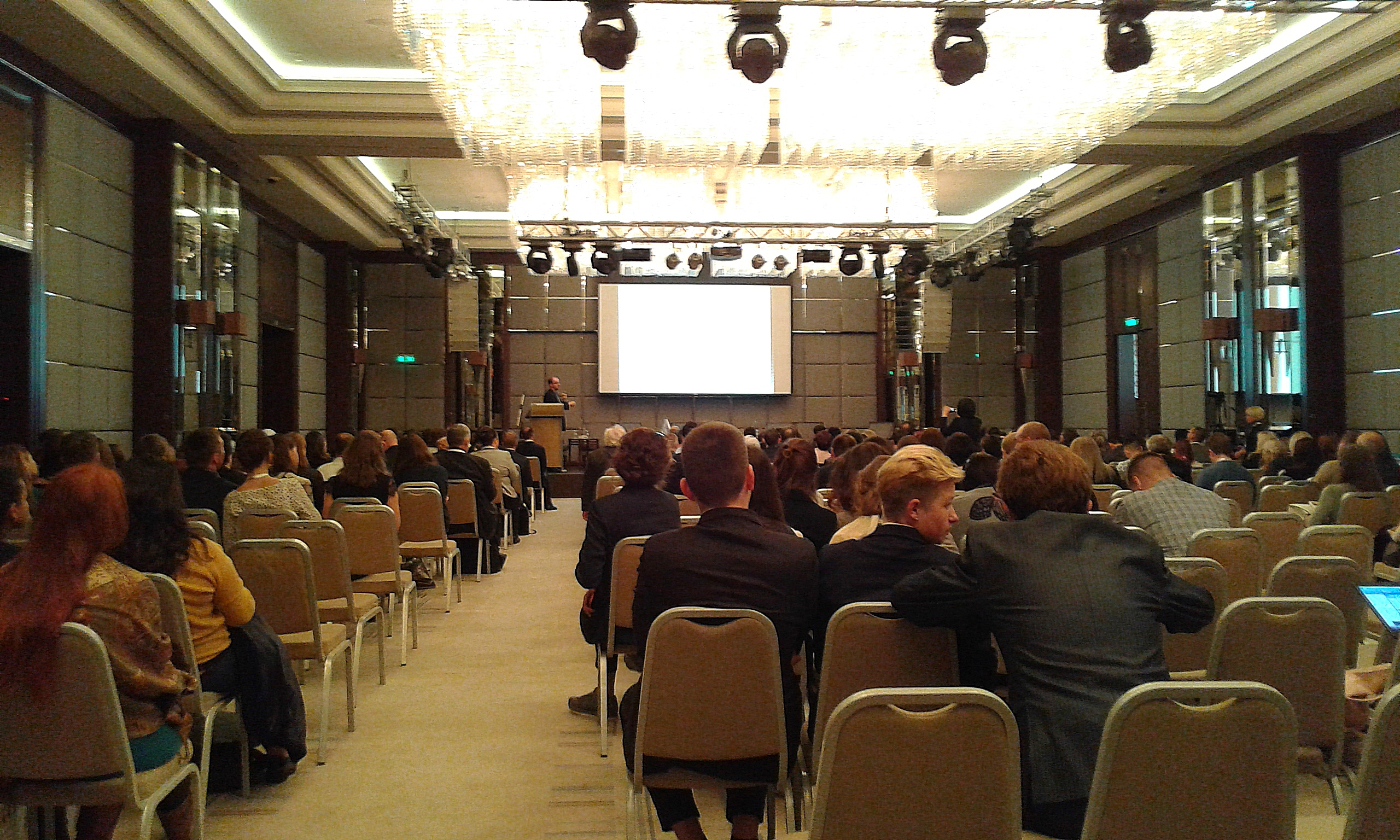
Prof. Nima Rezai presentation at USERN congress in Kharkiv, Ukraine

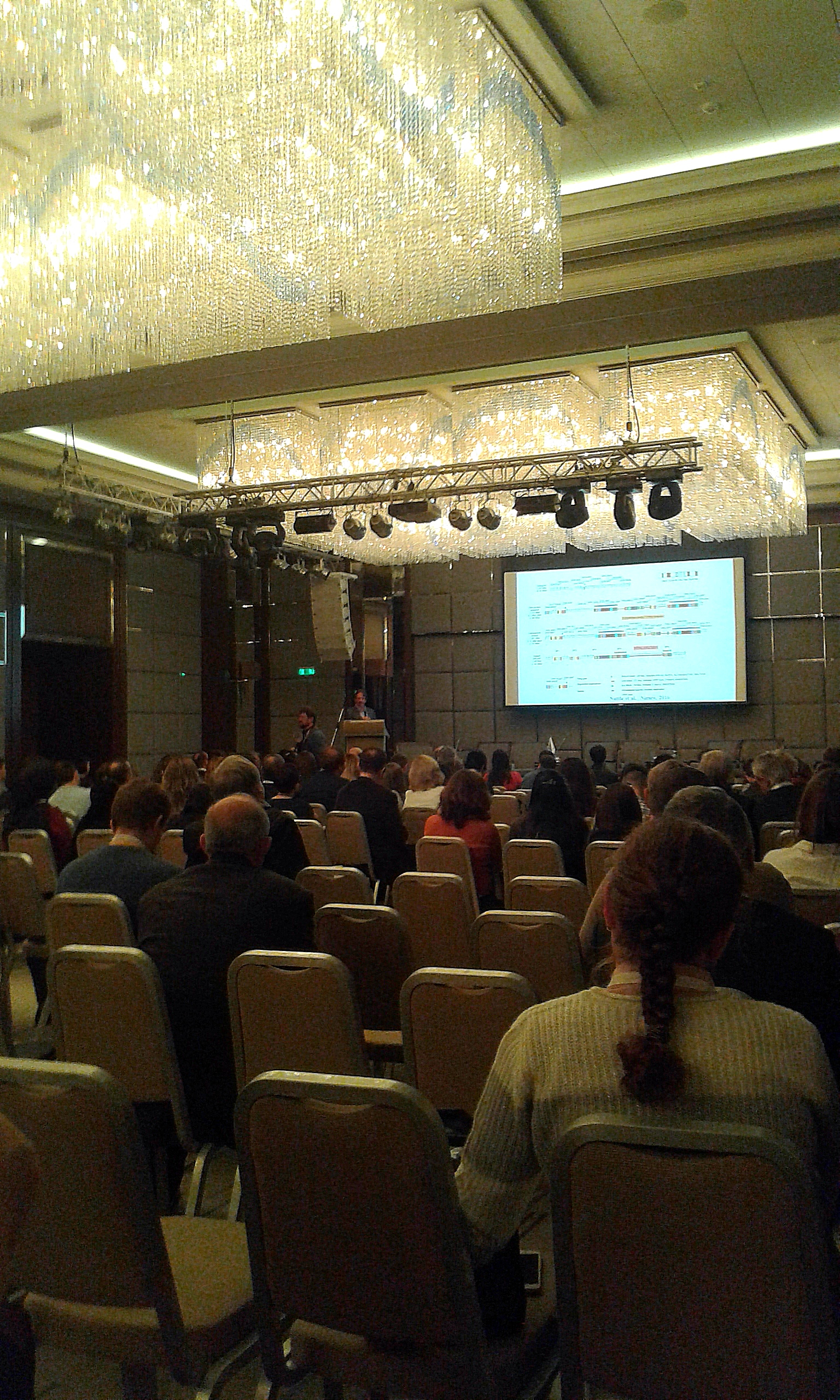
Prof. Evan Eichler presentation at USERN congress in Kharkiv, Ukraine
