= Behavioral and Brain Functions =

- Discipline: Behavioral neuroscience
- Language: English
- Edited by: Robert Gerlai

Publication details
- History: 2005–present
- Publisher: BioMed Central
- Frequency: Continuous
- Open access: Yes
- License: Creative Commons Attribution
- Impact factor: 3.3 (2024)

Standard abbreviations
- ISO 4: Behav. Brain Funct.

Indexing
- CODEN: BBFEBO
- ISSN: 1744-9081
- LCCN: 2005243558
- OCLC no.: 59722804

Links
- Journal homepage; Online access

Behavioral and Brain Functions is a peer-reviewed open-access scientific journal published by BioMed Central. It publishes articles on "all aspects of neurobiology where the unifying theme is behavior or behavioral dysfunction". It was established in 2005 with Terje Sagvolden as founding editor-in-chief.

== Editors-in-chief ==
The following persons are or have been (co-)editor-in-chief:

- Robert Gerlai (University of Toronto Mississauga, 2024–present)
- Wim Crusio (Université de Bordeaux; 2017–2024)
- Vivienne A. Russell (University of Cape Town; 2011–2017)
- Rosemary Tannock (University of Toronto; 2011–2016)
- Terje Sagvolden (University of Oslo; 2005–2011)

== Abstracting and indexing ==
The journal is abstracted and indexed in:

- Aquatic Sciences and Fisheries Abstracts
- Chemical Abstracts Service
- EBSCO databases
- Embase
- Index Medicus/MEDLINE/PubMed
- ProQuest databases
- PsycINFO
- Science Citation Index Expanded
- Scopus

According to the Journal Citation Reports, the journal has a 2024 impact factor of 3.3.
