= Morteza Mahmoudi =

Iranian-American Nanotechnologist

- مرتضی محمودی
- Born: 1979 (age 46–47); Tehran, Iran
- Education: University of Tehran (BSc), Amirkabir University of Technology (MSc), Sharif University of Technology (PhD), Stanford University (PostDoc)
- Awards: BRIght Futures Prize, IGNITE Award, USERN Prize, AAAS Award for Scientific Freedom and Responsibility
- Scientific career
- Fields: Nanotechnology, Academic Health
- Workplaces: Michigan State University, Harvard University, Stanford University
- Website: https://paritymovement.org/about/

Morteza Mahmoudi (born 1979) is an Iranian-American nanotechnologist and Associate Professor in the Department of Radiology and Precision Health Program at Michigan State University. Previously, he was an assistant professor at Harvard University. Mahmoudi is a winner of 2026 AAAS Award for Scientific Freedom and Responsibility, 2018 BRIght Futures Prize, 2018 IGNITE Award, and 2016 USERN Prize. He is best known for his works on i) protein corona and ii) preventing academic bullying;; he is also a co-founder of a non-profit organization called the Academic Parity Movement which is focused on addressing academic bullying issue in various disciplines.

== Books ==
- A Brief Guide to Academic Bullying, 2022
- Protein-Nanoparticle Interactions: The Bio-Nano Interface 2013
- Iron Oxide Nanoparticles for Biomedical Applications 2017
- Superparamagnetic Iron Oxide Nanoparticles 2010
- Protein-Nanoparticle Interactions: The Bio-Nano Interface 2013
