= Paul R. Sanberg =

American scientist and inventor

Paul R. Sanberg is an American scientist and inventor. His early work focused on the causes of brain cell death. His recent research has been on methods of repairing damaged brain tissue, and, in tandem with other scientists, demonstrating that stem cells derived from the blood of bone marrow and umbilical cords can be converted to neural cells.

Sanberg is a distinguished university professor of medicine, engineering, and business at the University of South Florida. He served as Senior Vice President for Research, Innovation and Knowledge Enterprise from 2012 to 2021. He is also the President and Founder of the National Academy of Inventors.

== Biography ==
Paul Sanberg was born in 1955 in Coral Gables, Florida. Sanberg attended Villa Park High School in California and graduated from Staples High School, in Staples, Minnesota, and received his Bachelor of Science (in Psychology and Biology) from York University, in Toronto, Ontario (Canada) in 1976. He then received a Master of Science (Neurological Sciences) from The University of British Columbia, Vancouver, B.C. (Canada); he received his Ph.D. in 1981 from the Australian National University, which subsequently awarded him a D.Sc. in 1998. He undertook a Post-Doctoral Fellowship (Behavioral Biology and Neuroscience) at The Australian National University in 1981, followed by a Post-Doctoral Fellowship (Neuroscience) at Johns Hopkins Medical School, Baltimore, Maryland (USA) from 1981 to 1983.

He taught at Ohio University, the University of Cincinnati, and Brown University prior to becoming the Associate Dean in Morsani College of Medicine at the University of South Florida. He was promoted at USF, eventually becoming the Senior Vice President for Research, Innovation and Knowledge Enterprise. He was appointed Wilsmore Professor at the University of Melbourne as a 2018 Fulbright Specialist, and an Honorary Visiting Professor, Wade Institute of Entrepreneurship, Ormond College, University of Melbourne and Australian National University. He serves on the selection committee of the U.S. Patent & Trademark Office Innovation Expo at the Smithsonian, and has served on the nomination evaluation committee of the United States National Medal of Technology and Innovation since 2012. He is president and Founder of the National Academy of Inventors, a partner organization with the United States Patent and Trademark Office to honor and enhance academic invention.

== Scientific career ==
Sanberg's research has focused on the functions of the human brain, the causes of its deterioration, and treatments for mental disorders. He is a spokesperson for breakthrough treatments in the treatment of Alzheimer's, Parkinson's, Tourette syndrome, and trauma.

=== Nicotine research ===
In 2000, Sanberg and fellow scientist Archie Silver conducted a study of the effects of nicotine patches on Tourette's victims. The study involved seventy young people with Tourette's. Those who were administered the nicotine patch along with Haldol showed significantly increased muscle control and ability to desist from verbal outbursts. The study suggests that nicotine and its analogues could also be used to treat the symptoms of mental disorders including Parkinson's and Alzheimer's.

=== Stem cell research ===
In 2001, Sanberg led a study that uncovered new therapeutic uses for umbilical cord cells. The study was conducted by injecting stem cells into rats that had undergone strokes. Sanberg's team found that the injected rats recovered fifty percent more brain function than did the control group. This discovery was found to have applications to the treatment of stroke. Sanberg explained to media outlets that the umbilical cells could be injected directly into the blood stream where they would be attracted to the stroke-damaged brain. Media coverage noted that the study used only tissue from umbilical cords, most of which is discarded as waste, meaning the study was uncomplicated by the ethical questions surrounding other forms of stem cell research.

== Honors and awards ==
Sanberg is a fellow of the American Association for the Advancement of Science, the American College of Neuropsychopharmacology, the American Institute for Medical and Biological Engineering, the American Psychological Association, the American Psychological Society, the International Behavioral Neuroscience Society, the National Academy of Inventors, the New York Academy of Sciences, the Royal Society of Chemistry, the Royal Society of Medicine, and the Royal Society for Public Health. In 2006 he was appointed to the Kyoto Prize Nomination Committee by the Inamori Foundation, Japan. In 2011 he received the Everfront Award at the Pan Pacific Symposium on Stem Cell and Cancer Research, Taichung, Taiwan. In 2014 Sanberg was named an Invention Ambassador by the American Association for the Advancement of Science and The Lemelson Foundation. In 2015 he was the named Medalist of the Florida Academy of Sciences. Also in 2015, he was inducted into the Florida Inventors Hall of Fame, and was named Alumnus of the Year for Research or Academics by the Australian National University, Canberra.

In 2016 Sanberg was the recipient of the Sigma XI John P. McGovern Science and Society Award. Also in 2016, he was made a Senior Member of the Institute of Electrical and Electronics Engineers. In 2018 he was the recipient of the Bryden Alumni Award for Outstanding Achievement from York University. In 2019 he was presented with the AIMBE Fellow Advocate Award from the American Institute for Medical and Biological Engineering.
