= Nima Rezaei =

Iranian scientist

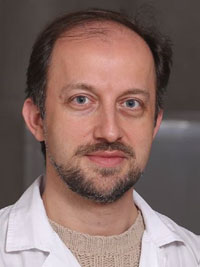
- Born: 9 June 1976 (age 50); Qaem Shahr, Iran
- Education: Alborz High School; Tehran University of Medical Sciences (M.D.); University of Sheffield (M.Sc., Ph.D.); Newcastle University (Fellowship)
- Scientific career
- Fields: Immunology
- Workplaces: Research Center for Immunodeficiencies, Tehran University of Medical Sciences

Nima Rezaei (Persian: نیما رضایی; born in Qaem Shahr, Iran) is an Iranian scientist, a professor of clinical immunology and allergy at Tehran University of Medical Sciences, Associate Dean of International Affairs in the School of Medicine and the Director of Global Academic Program (GAP). Nima Rezaei is the mastermind, founder and current president of the Universal Scientific Education and Research Network (USERN). Rezaei is known for his research in Primary Immunodeficiencies, characterization and treatment. He initiated the Iranian Primary Immunodeficiency Diseases Registry (IPIDR) in 1999 under supervision of Professor Asghar Aghamohammadi, which earned him the best research project award in the 4th Avicenna festival.

== Early life and education ==
Nima Rezaei was born in a well-educated family with northern Iranian origin. His parents are originally from Mazandaran province. He was born on June 9, 1976. He attended the prestigious junior Alborz High School in Tehran located at College Crossroad, Tehran. He entered the TUMS School of Medicine in 1995. He received his MD degree in 2002 and further studied Molecular and Genetic Medicine, in the School of Medicine and Biomedical Sciences, The University of Sheffield, UK and further received his PhD in Clinical Immunology and Human Genetics there. He received a Short-term fellowship in Clinical Immunology and Bone Marrow Transplantation in Paediatric Immunology and Infectious Diseases & Northern Supra Regional Bone Marrow Transplant Unit for SCID and Related Disorders. He has two daughters Ariana Rezaei and Arnika Rezaei. His older daughter, Ariana is a musician/singer studying at Berklee College of Music in Boston, Massachusetts. Her younger daughter, Arnika is still in middle school. Newcastle, UK, awarded by the ESID (European Society of Immunodeficiency).

== Career ==
He has authored more than 1000 publications, including five books to receive the 10th, 16th and 17th Avicenna Festival awards for best book of the year for; "Primary Immunodeficiency Diseases", Immunology of Aging" and "Cancer Immunology" series. He has also won the 12th and 18th Razi Research Festival on Medical Sciences award as Distinctive Researcher in Basic Sciences. In 2013 he received the AAAAI (American Academy of Allergy, Asthma and Immunology) International Young Investigator Award. Since 2014, his name has been listed among the World top 1% scientists by the essential indicators of science the ESI.

=== Awards ===
He has won some awards in his research and scientific areas as well as educational work, besides the above mentioned: -One of the Best 10 Scientists of the Country in the Last Decade (2004-2013) in the 2014 Festival of the National Academy of Medical Sciences - The 3rd Rank of the Best Article in Basic Sciences in the 2012 Festival of the National Academy of Medical Sciences -The 2nd Rank of the Best Article in Clinical Sciences in the 2014 Festival of the National Academy of Medical Sciences -Iran Young Scientist Scopus Award 2014, by Elsevier The best researcher at the 18th Avicenna Festival, February 2017: He was recognized and acknowledged as the distinguished Scientist of the decade by National Academy of Medical Sciences, Iran and as an Outstanding Researcher at the 18th Avicenna Festival.

=== Executive work and responsibilities ===
Nima Rezaei served as the Executive Director of UNESCO Chair in Health Education in TUMS from 2004 to 2006. He was also the Deputy Head of the Children's Medical Center Hospital, Paediatrics Center of Excellence in Iran from 2010-2015. Since 2015, he has held the positions of Vice Dean of International Affairs, School of Medicine, Tehran University of Medical Sciences, and Deputy President of Research Center for Immunodeficiencies. He is the founder of USERN network and the HEART (Health and Art) network. He also has a 5 year experience as the Executive Manager of the Iranian Journal of Allergy, Asthma and Immunology. Since 2019 he is co-editor of Advances in Experimental Medicine and Biology.
