= Spontaneously hypertensive rat =

Animal model of human cardiovascular and psychiatric disorders

Spontaneously hypertensive rat (SHR) is a laboratory rat which is an animal model of primary hypertension, used to study cardiovascular disease. It is the most studied model of hypertension measured as number of publications. The SHR strain was obtained during the 1960s by Okamoto and colleagues, who started breeding Wistar-Kyoto rats with high blood pressure.

== Pathophysiology ==
Hypertensive development begins around 5–6 weeks of age, reaching systolic pressures between 180 and 200 mmHg in the adult age phase. Starting between 40 and 50 weeks, SHR develops characteristics of cardiovascular disease, such as vascular and cardiac hypertrophy.

== Blood pressure in SHR depends on the kidney ==
Hypertensive development is somehow connected to the kidney. Transplanting a kidney from SHR to a normotensive Wistar rat increases blood pressure in the recipient. Conversely, transferring a Wistar kidney to SHR normalizes blood pressure in the recipient. This also happens if transplantation takes place at young age before established hypertension in the donors, indicating a primary role for the kidney in the development of hypertension in SHR.

== SHR and coping ==
Even though SHR is usually considered to be a purely pathological model, the strain exhibit interesting compensatory abilities. For example, kidneys transplanted from SHR to a hypertensive recipient retain better morphology than kidneys transplanted from Brown Norway, demonstrating a pathological adaptation to high blood pressure.

== The stroke prone SHR ==
Stroke prone SHR (SHR-SP) is a further development of SHR that has even higher blood pressure than SHR and a strong tendency to die from stroke.

== Attention Deficit Hyperactivity Disorder ==
The Spontaneously Hypertensive Rat (SHR) is also used as a model of attention-deficit hyperactivity disorder. Research by Terje Sagvolden suggested that rats sourced from Charles River Laboratories perform as the best model. If the animal is to be used as a model of ADHD, it is generally advised to start testing when the animals are around four weeks old (28 postnatal days) before the onset of hypertension.

Despite the criticisms associated with using animals to research essentially human conditions, Sagvolden supported his Dynamic Developmental Theory of ADHD using research primarily done using Spontaneously Hypertensive Rats. In addition, numerous studies have been conducted in the SHR in relation to other elements of ADHD, for example, looking at the impact of different drug treatments such as atomoxetine and methylphenidate on tests of impulsivity and attention and hyperactivity, investigating possible neural correlates of heightened distractibility in ADHD and assessing reward function.

== Reference strain ==
The reference strain to best illustrate the ADHD-like deficits of the SHR is the Sprague-Dawley. Although some argue that the deficits are only present because the Sprague-Dawley is naturally less active anyway.

== Other uses ==
The Spontaneous Hypertensive Rat is also a model for anxiety. Extracellular ATP is a mediator of arterial wall hyperplasia and hypertrophy in this model, as notably demonstrated by Jacobson et al 2006 and Kolosova et al 2005 - a regulator of vascular permeability, by the same - and controls smooth muscle cell and blood cell (including monocyte) migration and proliferation, demonstrated in Gerasimovskaya et al 2002, Satterwhite et al 1999, Kaczmarek et al 2005, Lemoli et al 2004, and Rossi et al 2007. In addition, recent studies have identified the Spontaneous Hypertensive Rat as a useful model for hypertension-associated alterations in thrombopoiesis. SHR exhibit a consistent increase in mean platelet volume (MPV), a hematological trait frequently associated with enhanced cardiovascular risk.

=== See also ===
- Animal models of ischemic stroke
