= Advances in Experimental Medicine and Biology =

- Discipline: Experimental medicine and biology
- Language: English
- Edited by: Wim E. Crusio, Haidong Dong, Heinfried H. Radeke, Nima Rezaei, Ortrud Steinlein, Junjie Xiao

Publication details
- History: 1967-present
- Publisher: Springer Nature
- Frequency: Irregular
- Impact factor: 3.650 (2021)

Standard abbreviations
- ISO 4: Adv. Exp. Med. Biol.

Indexing
- CODEN: AEMBAP
- ISSN: 0065-2598 (print); 2214-8019 (web)
- LCCN: sf77000246
- OCLC no.: 1072242095

Links
- Journal homepage; Online archive

Advances in Experimental Medicine and Biology is a peer-reviewed book series. It covers the broad fields of experimental medicine and biology. The series was established in 1967 and is published by Springer Nature. The editors-in-chief are Wim E. Crusio (French National Centre for Scientific Research and University of Bordeaux), Haidong Dong (Mayo Clinic), Heinfried H. Radeke (Goethe University), Nima Rezaei (Tehran University of Medical Sciences), Ortrud Steinlein (LMU Munich), and Junjie Xiao (Shanghai University).

== Abstracting and indexing ==
The series is abstracted and indexed in:

- BIOSIS Previews
- Embase
- Index Medicus/MEDLINE/PubMed
- Science Citation Index Expanded
- Scopus

According to the Journal Citation Reports, the series has a 2021 impact factor of 3.650.
