= Neurotoxicology and Teratology =

- Discipline: Toxicology, neuroscience
- Language: English
- Edited by: Gregg Stanwood

Publication details
- Former names: Neurobehavioral Toxicology, Neurobehavioral Toxicology and Teratology
- History: 1979-present
- Publisher: Elsevier
- Frequency: Bimonthly
- Impact factor: 3.763 (2021)

Standard abbreviations
- ISO 4: Neurotoxicol. Teratol.

Indexing
- CODEN: NETEEC
- ISSN: 0892-0362
- LCCN: 81642303
- OCLC no.: 39098352

Links
- Journal homepage; Online access

Neurotoxicology and Teratology is a bimonthly peer-reviewed scientific journal covering research on the toxicological effects of chemical and physical agents on the nervous system. It was established in 1979 as Neurobehavioral Toxicology, was renamed to Neurobehavioral Toxicology and Teratology in 1981, and obtained its current title in 1987. It is published by Elsevier and the editor-in-chief is Gregg Stanwood (Florida State University).

== Abstracting and indexing ==
The journal is abstracted and indexed in:

- BIOSIS Previews
- CASSI
- Current Contents/Life Sciences
- Embase
- EMBiology
- Elsevier BIOBASE
- Index Medicus/MEDLINE/PubMed
- Science Citation Index
- Scopus

According to the Journal Citation Reports, the journal has a 2019 impact factor of 3.274.
