= International Behavioral Neuroscience Society =

- Abbreviation: IBNS
- Formation: 1992
- Legal status: Association
- Purpose: to encourage research and education in the field of behavioral neuroscience
- Headquarters: San Antonio, TX, USA
- Region served: Worldwide
- Members: 800
- President: Mikhail Pletnikov
- Main organ: Council
- Staff: 1
- Website: www.ibnsconnect.org

The International Behavioral Neuroscience Society (IBNS), was founded in 1992. The goal of the IBNS is to "encourage research and education in the field of behavioral neuroscience". Its current president is Mikhail Pletnikov. Brain Research Bulletin, Neuroscience and Biobehavioral Reviews, and Physiology and Behavior are official journals of the IBNS.

== Profile ==
=== Mission ===
The IBNS mission statement is to encourage research and education in the field of behavioral neuroscience by:

- Promoting and encouraging education and research with respect to behavioral neuroscience
- Collaborating with existing public and private organizations to promote and encourage education and research in behavioral neuroscience.

=== Awards ===
Each year the IBNS recognizes top scientists in the field of behavioral neuroscience with:

- The Matthew J. Wayner-NNOXe Pharmaceuticals Award for distinguished lifetime contributions to behavioral neuroscience
- Electing individuals who have made substantial contributions to the Society and to the field of behavioral neuroscience as Fellows.

In addition, the International Behavioral Neuroscience Society's award for "outstanding accomplishments in support of scientific research relevant to behavioral neuroscience" is given at irregular intervals. Past recipients include Richard K. Nakamura, Deputy Director of the National Institute for Mental Health.

== History ==
The Society was founded in 1992 with Matthew J. Wayner as its founding president. Other past-presidents have been Paul R. Sanberg (1993), Robert D. Meyer (1994), Linda P. Spear (1995), Gerard P. Smith (1996), Michael L. Woodruff (1997), Robert L. Isaacson (1998), Laszlo Lenard (1999), Jacqueline N. Crawley (2000), John P. Bruno (2001), Mark A. Geyer (2002), Robert Blanchard (2003), C. Sue Carter (2004) Robert Adamec, (2005), Joseph Huston (2006), and Robert Gerlai (2007–2008). The immediate past-president is Kelly Lambert (2009–2010) and the current president is Caroline Blanchard. The society organizes annual meetings and parts of the presentations at these meetings are regularly published as supplements or special issues of peer-reviewed scientific journals.
