= Douglas Wahlsten =

Canadian neuroscientist

- Born: October 13, 1943 (age 82)
- Citizenship: Canadian
- Education: Alma College; University of California, Irvine
- Scientific career
- Fields: Behavioral neuroscience, psychology
- Workplaces: University of Waterloo; University of Alberta
- Thesis: Direct Comparisons of Classical and Avoidance Training of Leg Flexion in Dogs (1969)
- Doctoral advisor: Michael Cole
- Website: www.psych.ualberta.ca/~wahlsten/

Douglas Leon Wahlsten (born October 13, 1943) is a Canadian neuroscientist, psychologist, and behavior geneticist. He is a professor emeritus of psychology at the University of Alberta. As of 2011, he was also a visiting professor at the University of North Carolina at Greensboro in North Carolina, United States. He is known for his laboratory research on the behavior of mice, and for his theoretical writings on a wide range of other topics. His laboratory research has included studies of the effects of different laboratory environments and experimenter characteristics on the results of mouse studies. He and his colleagues have also developed an altered form of the rotarod performance test involving wrapping sandpaper around the rod, to reduce the ability of mice to grip the rod and ride around on it. He has criticized some of his fellow behavior geneticists for trying to separate the effects of genes and the environment on human intelligence, an endeavor he considers futile. He also met and became friends with Leilani Muir, later helping to edit her autobiography, A Whisper Past. He was the president of the International Behavioural and Neural Genetics Society from 2000 to 2001.

Wahlsten is a member of the editorial board of Genes, Brain and Behavior, has co-edited a book on Techniques for the Genetic Analysis of Brain and Behavior focussing on the mouse, and authored acclaimed books on mouse behavior testing and human behavioral neurogenetics. In 2024, he published his autobiography in two parts: one about his involvement in politics, the other on his scientific endeavors.
