= Neuroscience & Biobehavioral Reviews =

- Discipline: Behavioral neuroscience
- Language: English
- Edited by: Giovanni Laviola

Publication details
- Former name: Biobehavioral Reviews
- History: 1977–present
- Publisher: Elsevier
- Frequency: 10/year
- Open access: optional
- Impact factor: 8.2 (2022)

Standard abbreviations
- ISO 4: Neurosci. Biobehav. Rev.

Indexing
- CODEN: NBREDE
- ISSN: 0149-7634 (print); 1873-7528 (web)
- LCCN: 78-643607
- OCLC no.: 3552135

Links
- Journal homepage; Online access

Neuroscience & Biobehavioral Reviews is a peer-reviewed scientific journal covering behavioral neuroscience published by Elsevier. The journal publishes reviews, theoretical articles, and mini-reviews. It is an official journal of the International Behavioral Neuroscience Society.

== Abstracting and indexing ==
The journal is abstracted and indexed by BIOSIS, Current Contents/Life Sciences, EMBASE, MEDLINE, Science Citation Index, and Scopus. According to the Journal Citation Reports, Neuroscience & Biobehavioral Reviews has a 2022 impact factor of 8.2.
