= Elissa J. Chesler =

American behavioral genetics researcher

Elissa Chesler (born July 18, 1973) is a research professor and senior director at The Jackson Laboratory in Bar Harbor, Maine. She holds the position of Ann Watson Symington Chair in Addiction Research. Her field of study is behavioral genetics and bioinformatics, with a focus on understanding the genetic basis of complex behaviors, including addiction, autism, and learning deficits. Her research uses the laboratory mouse as a model organism. Her work has led to the development of GeneWeaver.org, a computational tool for multi-species data integration, and the identification of genes underlying behavioral variation.

== Education ==
In 1995, Chesler graduated from the University of Connecticut with a B.A. in Psychology and B.S. in Physiology & Neurobiology. She obtained her M.S. and her Ph.D in neuroscience from the University of Illinois Urbana-Champaign.

== Career ==
Chesler is currently Professor, The Ann Watson Symington Chair in Addiction Research, and Senior Director, Integrative Data Science at The Jackson Laboratory.

She has her own research lab, which integrates genetic and genomic data from model organisms, such as the laboratory mouse, with information on human behavioral disorders. She and her team have developed advanced computational tools and software for multi-species data integration to study health and disease. This work focuses on understanding the genetic and biological basis for the relationships among complex behavioral traits, including addiction and other related behaviors.
