= John C. Crabbe =

American neuroscientist and behavior geneticist

- Education: Stanford University; University of Colorado
- Known for: Mouse models of alcoholism
- Awards: 2015 Marlatt Mentorship Award from the Research Society on Alcoholism
- Scientific career
- Fields: Neuroscience
- Workplaces: Oregon Health & Science University
- Thesis: Effects of D-amphetamine on learning and memory in inbred and hybrid mice (1973)
- Doctoral advisor: Herbert Alpern

John C. Crabbe, Jr. is an American neuroscientist and behavior geneticist. He is a professor of behavioral neuroscience at the Oregon Health & Science University (OHSU) School of Medicine, where he has worked since 1979. He is also a senior research career scientist at the Veterans Affairs Medical Center in Portland, Oregon. He is also the former director of OHSU's Portland Alcohol Research Center.

Crabbe is known for his research using mouse models to study the pharmacogenetics of alcoholism. He is also known for a 1999 study he and his colleagues published documenting significant variations in certain mouse behaviors across different labs, even when they all tried to follow the same protocols. In 2011, he was chosen by the National Institute on Alcohol Abuse and Alcoholism to give the 16th annual Mark Keller Honorary Lecture.

Crabbe is a member of the editorial board of Genes, Brain and Behavior.
