= Psychiatric Genetics (journal) =

- Discipline: Psychiatric genetics
- Language: English
- Edited by: Andrew McQuillin

Publication details
- History: 1990-present
- Publisher: Lippincott Williams & Wilkins
- Frequency: Bimonthly
- Impact factor: 1.586 (2017)

Standard abbreviations
- ISO 4: Psychiatr. Genet.

Indexing
- ISSN: 0955-8829 (print); 1473-5873 (web)
- OCLC no.: 23835780

Links
- Journal homepage; Online access; Online archive

Psychiatric Genetics is a bimonthly medical journal published by Lippincott Williams & Wilkins within the field of psychiatric genetics. It is abstracted and indexed in MEDLINE/PubMed, BIOSIS Previews and the Science Citation Index Expanded. According to the Journal Citation Reports, the journal has a 2017 impact factor of 1.586.

== See also ==
- List of psychiatry journals
