= Neurogenetics =

Study of role of genetics in the nervous system

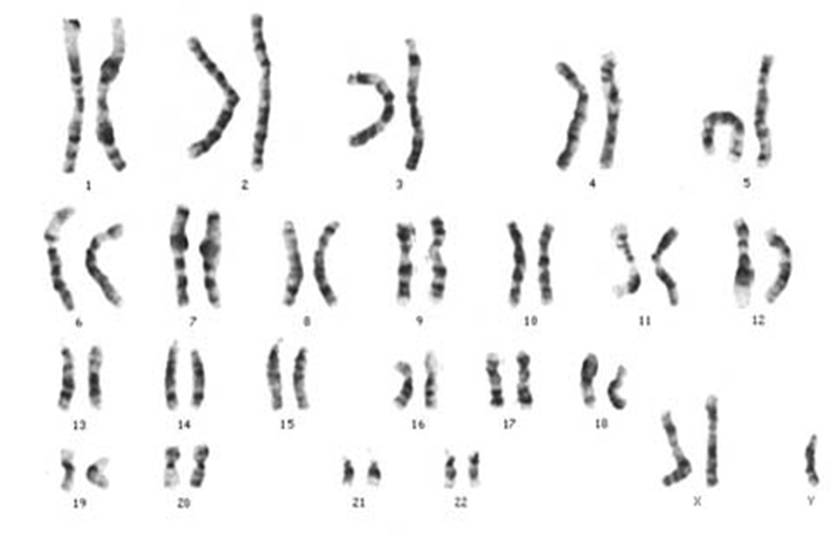
Human karyogram

Neurogenetics studies the role of genetics in the development and function of the nervous system. It considers neural characteristics as phenotypes (i.e. manifestations, measurable or not, of the genetic make-up of an individual), and is mainly based on the observation that the nervous systems of individuals, even of those belonging to the same species, may not be identical. As the name implies, it draws aspects from both the studies of neuroscience and genetics, focusing in particular how the genetic code an organism carries affects its expressed traits. Mutations in this genetic sequence can have a wide range of effects on the quality of life of the individual. Neurological diseases, behavior and personality are all studied in the context of neurogenetics. The field of neurogenetics emerged in the mid to late 20th century with advances closely following advancements made in available technology. Currently, neurogenetics is the center of much research utilizing cutting edge techniques.

== History ==
The field of neurogenetics emerged from advances made in molecular biology, genetics and a desire to understand the link between genes, behavior, the brain, and neurological disorders and diseases. The field started to expand in the 1960s through the research of Seymour Benzer, considered by some to be the father of neurogenetics.

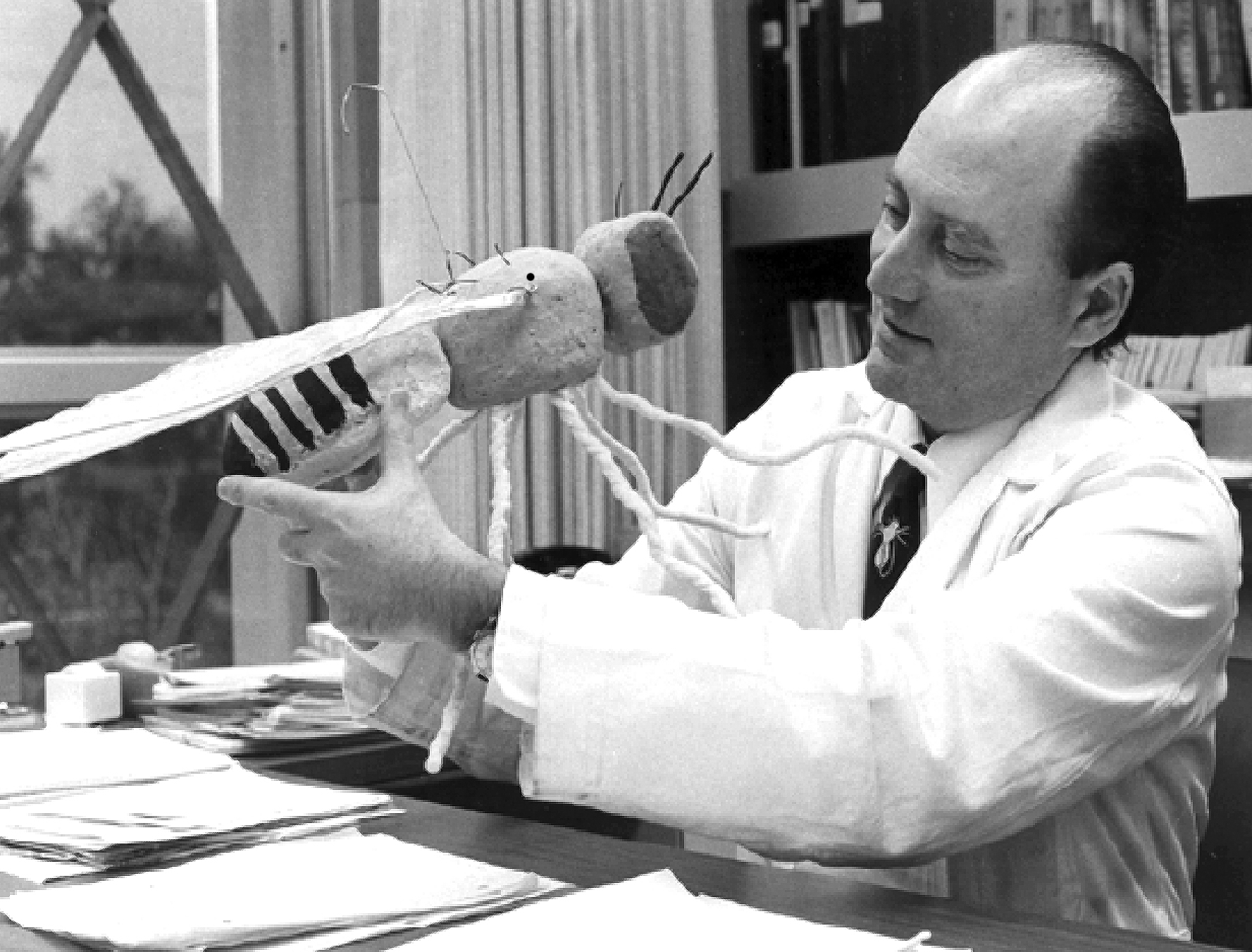
Seymour Benzer in his office at Caltech in 1974 with a big model of Drosophila

His pioneering work with Drosophila helped to elucidate the link between circadian rhythms and genes, which led to further investigations into other behavior traits. He also started conducting research in neurodegeneration in fruit flies in an attempt to discover ways to suppress neurological diseases in humans. Many of the techniques he used and conclusions he drew would drive the field forward.

Early analysis relied on statistical interpretation through processes such as LOD (logarithm of odds) scores of pedigrees and other observational methods such as affected sib-pairs, which looks at phenotype and IBD (identity by descent) configuration. Many of the disorders studied early on including Alzheimer's, Huntington's and amyotrophic lateral sclerosis (ALS) are still at the center of much research to this day. By the late 1980s new advances in genetics such as recombinant DNA technology and reverse genetics allowed for the broader use of DNA polymorphisms to test for linkage between DNA and gene defects. This process is referred to sometimes as linkage analysis. By the 1990s ever advancing technology had made genetic analysis more feasible and available. This decade saw a marked increase in identifying the specific role genes played in relation to neurological disorders. Advancements were made in but not limited to: Fragile X syndrome, Alzheimer's, Parkinson's, epilepsy and ALS.

== Neurological disorders ==
While the genetic basis of simple diseases and disorders has been accurately pinpointed, the genetics behind more complex, neurological disorders is still a source of ongoing research. New developments such as the genome wide association studies (GWAS) have brought vast new resources within grasp. With this new information genetic variability within the human population and possibly linked diseases can be more readily discerned. Neurodegenerative diseases are a more common subset of neurological disorders, with examples being Alzheimer's disease and Parkinson's disease. Currently no viable treatments exist that actually reverse the progression of neurodegenerative diseases; however, neurogenetics is emerging as one field that might yield a causative connection. The discovery of linkages could then lead to therapeutic drugs, which could reverse brain degeneration.

Types of Neurogenic disorders: There are many genes linked in different Neurogenetic conditions that are involved in inheritance patterns and biological mechanisms. These disorders can range from single gene conditions through inheritance to multi-gene conditions influenced by environmental factors.

Major Categories:

1. Monogenic Neurogenic Disorders - These are mutations in a single gene and closely follow Mendelian inheritance patterns such as autosomal dominant, recessive, and X-linked. These are more predictable diagnoses or inheritances.

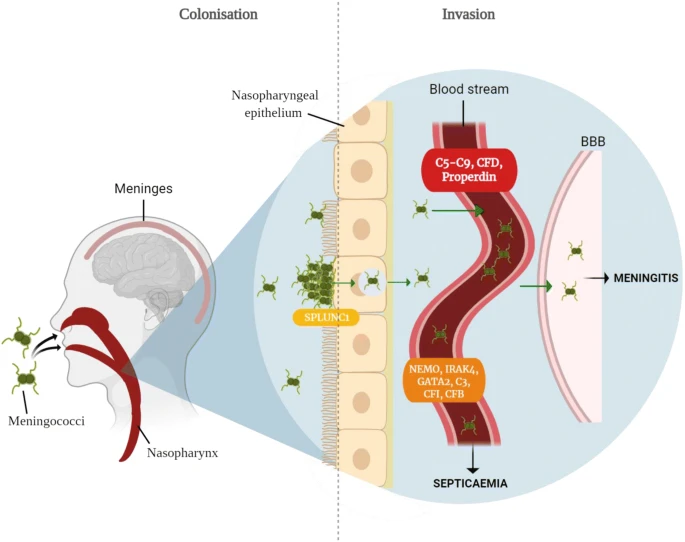
When a single immune gene is broken, it can allow meningitis bacteria to spread throughout the body. When one gene in the immune system is not functioning properly, the body cannot fully fight off meningococci, because of this the bacteria can travel to the bloodstream, brain, and infect the tissues around brain and spinal cord. Since one gene is the cause, this is an example of a monogenic neurogenic disorder.

Examples of Mutations include:

- SCN1A Mutation that causes epilepsy
- HTT genes that makes Huntington’s disease proteins
- SMN1 gene causes spinal muscular atrophy
- PMP22, MFN2, and GJB1 all cause Charcot-Marie- Tooth disease

Mechanism: The mutations are formed by the loss or gain of function leading to altered protein activity.

Inheritance pattern: Inheritance pattern varies by condition.

2. Polygenic Neurogenic disorders - These mutations are caused by many genes acting together, often with environmental contributions. They are not predictable and do not follow a clear Mendelian pattern.

Examples of polygenic risk disorders:

- Alzheimer’s disease contains one or two copies of the APOE ε4, which is the strongest gene factor in the disease, causing an increased likelihood of developing the condition. Other genes such as TREM2 can raise the risk. The alleles alone do not directly cause the disease but when combined, their effects interact and raise the risk by affecting brain function. They are polygenic where the risk is shaped by the additive or interactive influence of several genes alongside environmental and epigenetic factors.

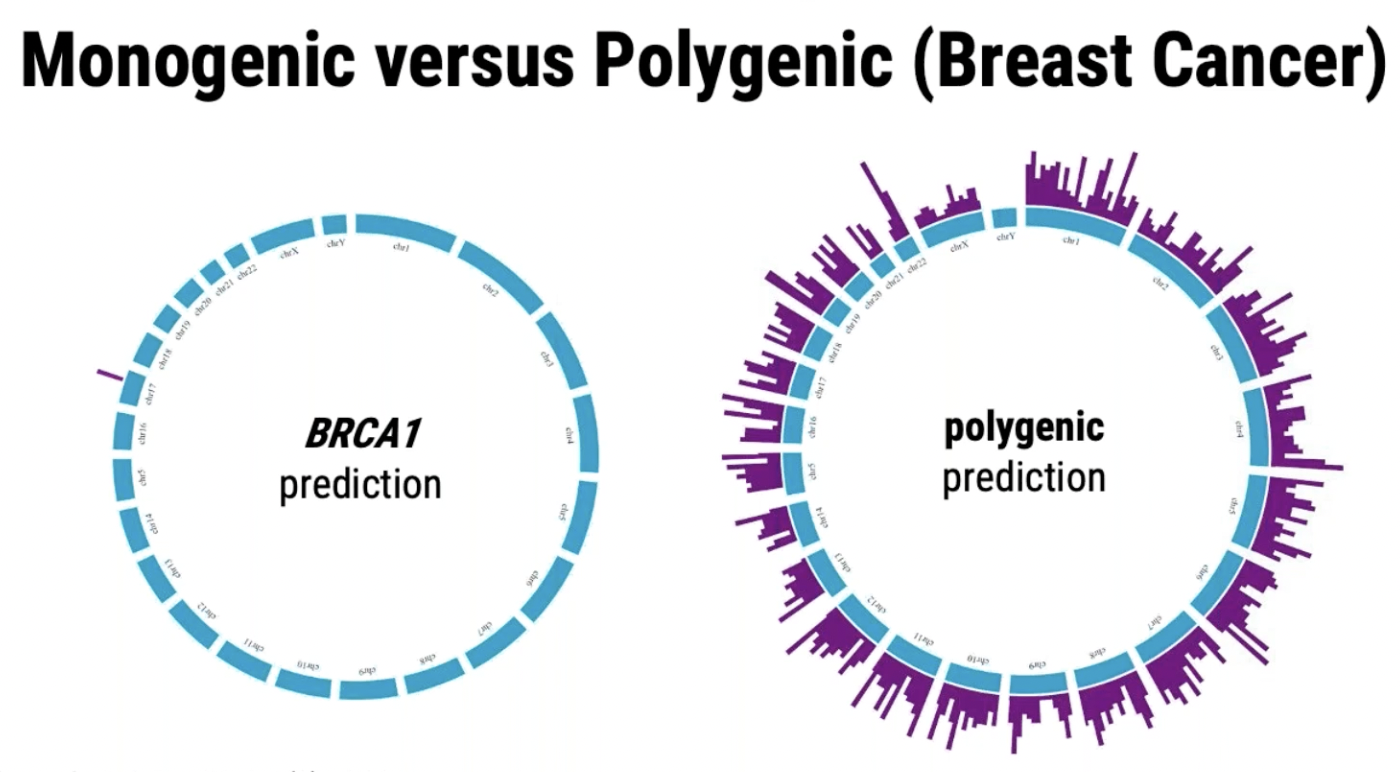
The comparison of monogenic and polygenetic architectures is important. Monogenetic is where a single strong gene change causes the disease while polygenetic is where many tiny gene changes that add up to increase risk. On the left, the BRCA1 gene shows a monogenic pattern where one mutation contributes to a high chance of diseases. On the right, polygenetic risks show hundreds of minor changes across the genome which causes the risk to slowly add up. Even though the example demonstrates breast cancer, the same idea applies to most neurogenetic disorders, which usually come from small genetic changes.

Mechanisms: Risk genes, how the environment affects them, other genes that change their effects, and why some people get the disease while others do not.

Inheritance pattern: Inheritance is influenced by multiple genes.

3. Neurodevelopment Disorders - These disorders make an appearance during brain development, often due to mutations affecting neuronal growth.

Example of Neurodevelopment disorder:

- MEC2 is a genetic disorder that affects motor and cognitive functions, mostly in girls.

Mechanisms: Mutations disrupt brain formation, neurons, growth, and communication.

Inheritance pattern: Often sporadic or multifactorial inheritance.

4. Mitochondrial and Metabolic Disorders - This type of mutation or disorder affects how cells produce energy.

Example of Mitochondrial disorder:

- POLG is a gene mutation led to mitochondrial encephalopathy like an infection or toxins in the bloodstream.

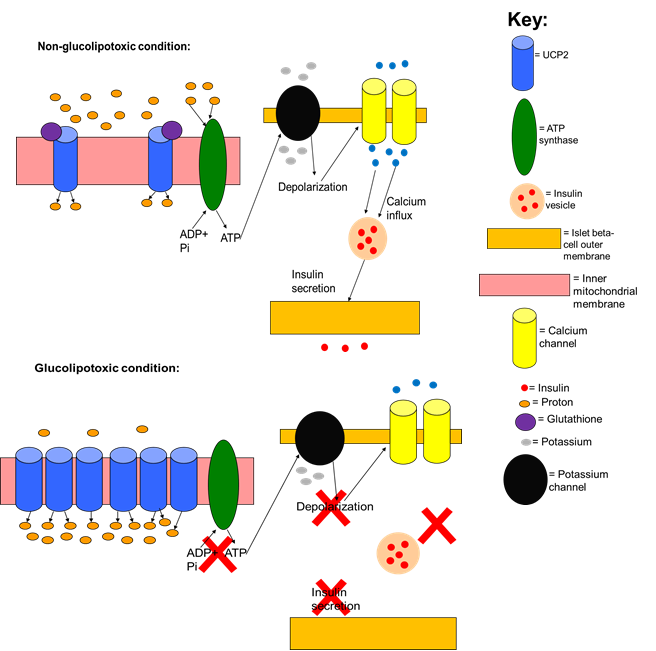
The mitochondria stores energy for the cell. When mitochondria is damaged, it cannot provide energy for the cell, which can cause problems. In the normal cell, the mitochondria make the energy to keep the cell signals working, but in the damaged cell, the mitochondria cannot make enough energy, and the cell cannot effectively communicate, eventually causing the cell to break down.

Mechanism: Mutation in mitochondrial or nuclear DNA disrupts energy production.

Inheritance pattern: Mitochondrial disorders are maternally inherited through mitochondrial DNA while metabolic disorders are typically autosomal recessive inheritance.

5. Movement Disorders and Ataxias - Genetic conditions that affects coordination and motor control.

Examples of Movement Disorders and Ataxias:

- TMEM240 mutations cause Spinocerebellar Ataxia (SCA21).

Mechanism: Genes affecting the cerebellum and motor pathways are muted.

Inheritance pattern: The inheritance varies, can be dominant, recessive, and X-linked.

6. Peripheral Neuropathies - consists of nerve damage in the arms, legs, and feet.

Example of Peripheral Neuropathies:

- PMP22 duplication causes Charcot-Marie-Tooth disease.

Mechanism: The mutation affects the myelin in the peripheral nerves.

Inheritance pattern: Common autosomal dominant or autosomal recessive.

== Gene sequencing ==
One of the most noticeable results of further research into neurogenetics is a greater knowledge of gene loci that show linkage to neurological diseases. The table below represents a sampling of specific gene locations identified to play a role in selected neurological diseases based on prevalence in the United States.

Gene loci	Neurological disease
APOE ε4, PICALM	Alzheimer's disease
C9orf72, SOD1	Amyotrophic lateral sclerosis
HTT	Huntington's disease
DR15, DQ6	Multiple sclerosis
LRRK2, PARK2, PARK7	Parkinson's disease

== Methods of research ==
=== Statistical analysis ===
Logarithm of odds (LOD) is a statistical technique used to estimate the probability of gene linkage between traits. LOD is often used in conjunction with pedigrees, maps of a family's genetic make-up, in order to yield more accurate estimations. A key benefit of this technique is its ability to give reliable results in both large and small sample sizes, which is a marked advantage in laboratory research.

Quantitative trait loci (QTL) mapping is another statistical method used to determine the chromosomal positions of a set of genes responsible for a given trait. By identifying specific genetic markers for the genes of interest in a recombinant inbred strain, the amount of interaction between these genes and their relation to the observed phenotype can be determined through complex statistical analysis. In a neurogenetics laboratory, the phenotype of a model organisms is observed by assessing the morphology of their brain through thin slices. QTL mapping can also be carried out in humans, though brain morphologies are examined using nuclear magnetic resonance imaging (MRI) rather than brain slices. Human beings pose a greater challenge for QTL analysis because the genetic population cannot be as carefully controlled as that of an inbred recombinant population, which can result in sources of statistical error.

=== Recombinant DNA ===
Recombinant DNA is an important method of research in many fields, including neurogenetics. It is used to make alterations to an organism's genome, usually causing it to over- or under-express a certain gene of interest, or express a mutated form of it. The results of these experiments can provide information on that gene's role in the organism's body, and it importance in survival and fitness. The hosts are then screened with the aid of a toxic drug that the selectable marker is resistant to. The use of recombinant DNA is an example of a reverse genetics, where researchers create a mutant genotype and analyze the resulting phenotype. In forward genetics, an organism with a particular phenotype is identified first, and its genotype is then analyzed.

=== Animal research ===
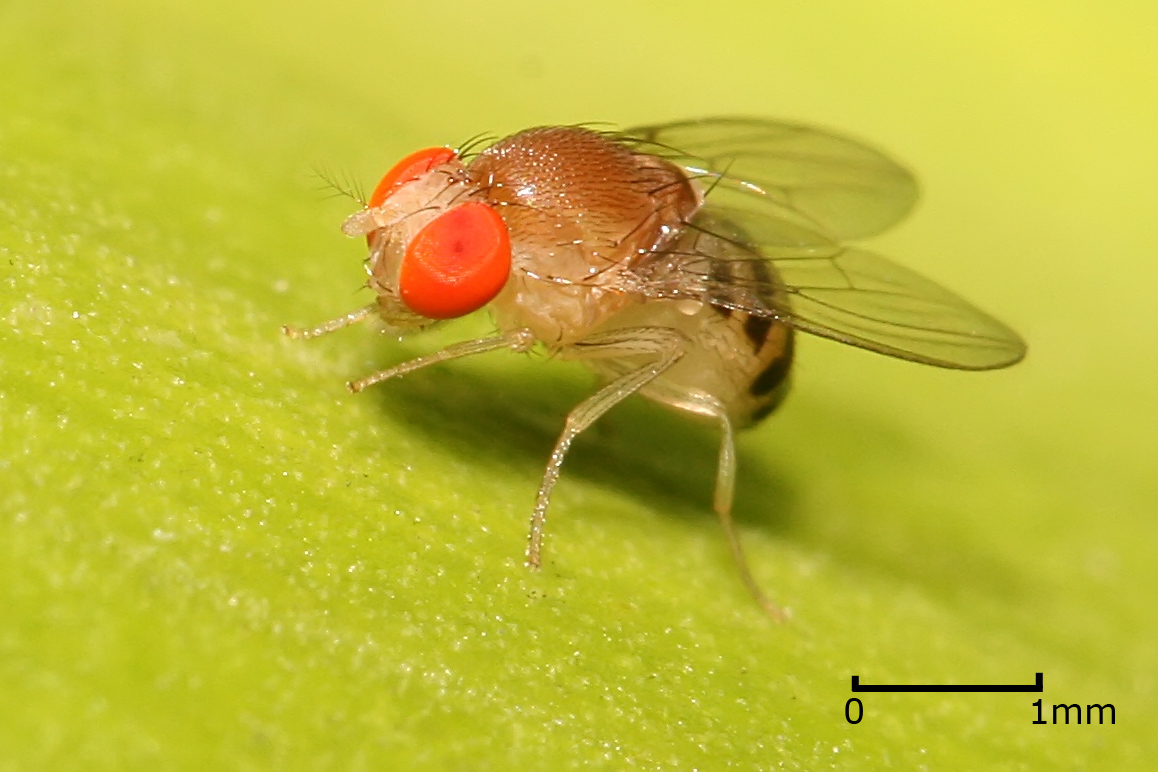
Drosophila

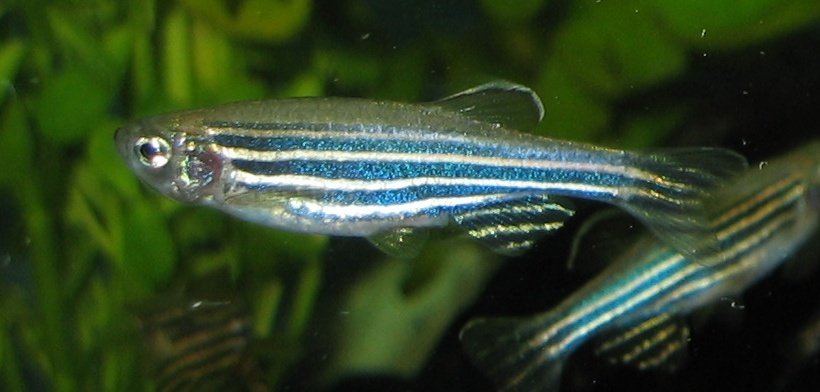
Zebrafish

Model organisms are an important tool in many areas of research, including the field of neurogenetics. By studying creatures with simpler nervous systems and with smaller genomes, scientists can better understand their biological processes and apply them to more complex organisms, such as humans. Due to their low-maintenance and highly mapped genomes, mice, Drosophila, and C. elegans are very common. Zebrafish and prairie voles have also become more common, especially in the social and behavioral scopes of neurogenetics.

In addition to examining how genetic mutations affect the actual structure of the brain, researchers in neurogenetics also examine how these mutations affect cognition and behavior. One method of examining this involves purposely engineering model organisms with mutations of certain genes of interest. These animals are then classically conditioned to perform certain types of tasks, such as pulling a lever in order to gain a reward. The speed of their learning, the retention of the learned behavior, and other factors are then compared to the results of healthy organisms to determine what kind of an effect – if any – the mutation has had on these higher processes. The results of this research can help identify genes that may be associated with conditions involving cognitive and learning deficiencies.

=== Human research ===
Many research facilities seek out volunteers with certain conditions or illnesses to participate in studies. Model organisms, while important, cannot completely model the complexity of the human body, making volunteers a key part to the progression of research. Along with gathering some basic information about medical history and the extent of their symptoms, samples are taken from the participants, including blood, cerebrospinal fluid, and/or muscle tissue. These tissue samples are then genetically sequenced, and the genomes are added to current database collections. The growth of these data bases will eventually allow researchers to better understand the genetic nuances of these conditions and bring therapy treatments closer to reality. Current areas of interest in this field have a wide range, spanning anywhere from the maintenance of circadian rhythms, the progression of neurodegenerative disorders, the persistence of periodic disorders, and the effects of mitochondrial decay on metabolism.

==== Genome-wide association studies ====
Such databases are used in genome-wide association studies (GWAS). Examples of phenotypes investigated by notable neurogenetics GWAS include:

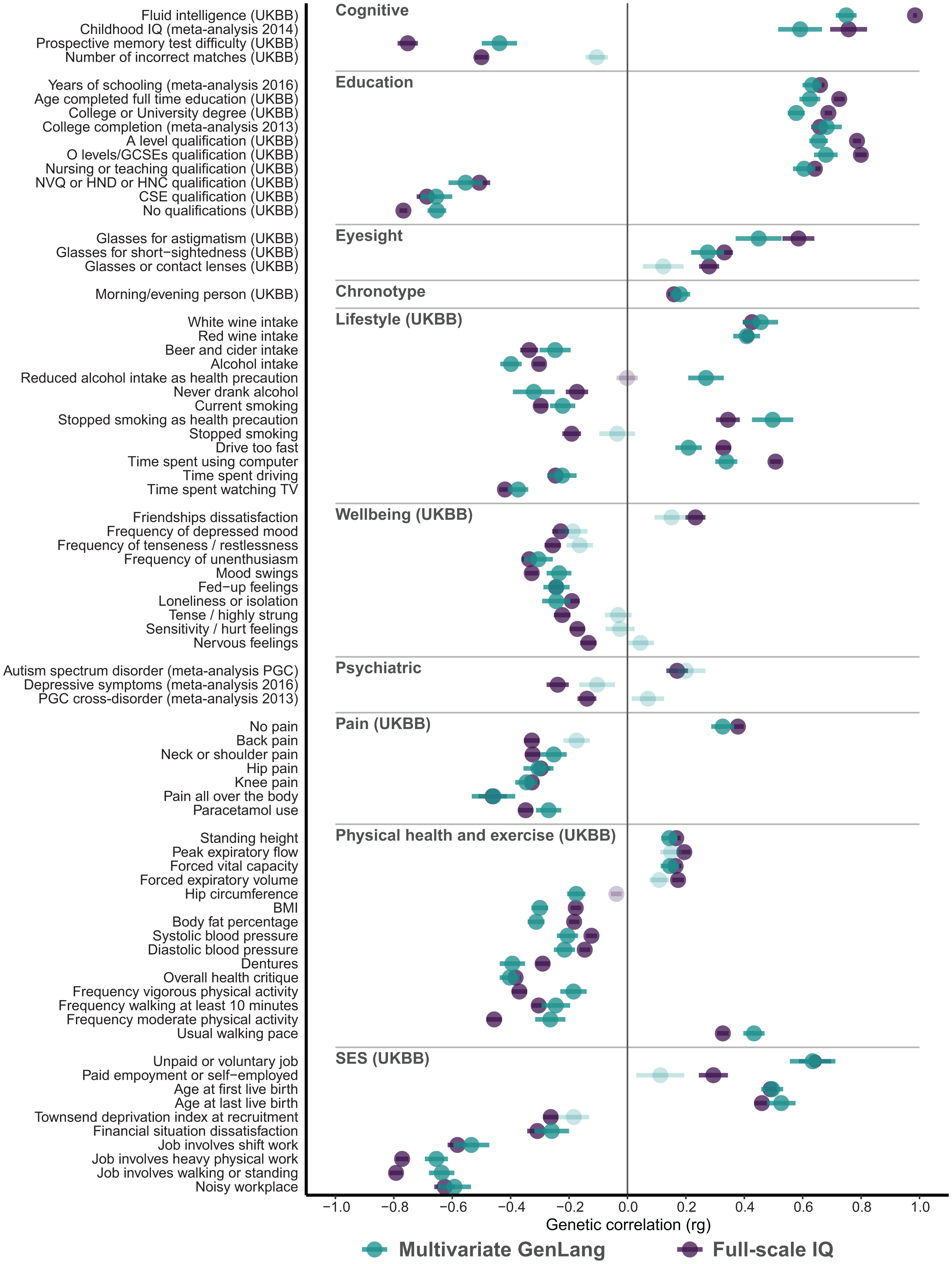
- Traits, IQ& language skills
  Language-related skills: a meta-analysis of GWAS reported genetic factors of, the so far uniquely human, language-related capabilities, in particular factors of differences in skill-levels of five tested traits. It also used neuroanatomy/neuroimaging data.

== Behavioral neurogenetics ==
Advances in molecular biology techniques and the species-wide genome project have made it possible to map out an individual's entire genome. Whether genetic or environmental factors are primarily responsible for an individual's personality has long been a topic of debate. Thanks to the advances being made in the field of neurogenetics, researchers have begun to tackle this question by beginning to map out genes and correlate them to different personality traits. There is little to no evidence to suggest that the presence of a single gene indicates that an individual will express one style of behavior over another; rather, having a specific gene could make one more predisposed to displaying this type of behavior. It is starting to become clear that most genetically influenced behaviors are due to the effects of many variants within many genes, in addition to other neurological regulating factors like neurotransmitter levels. Due to fact that many behavioral characteristics have been conserved across species for generations, researchers are able to use animal subjects such as mice and rats, but also fruit flies, worms, and zebrafish, to try to determine specific genes that correlate to behavior and attempt to match these with human genes.

=== Cross-species gene conservation ===
While it is true that variation between species can appear to be pronounced, at their most basic they share many similar behavior traits which are necessary for survival. Such traits include mating, aggression, foraging, social behavior and sleep patterns. This conservation of behavior across species has led biologists to hypothesize that these traits could possibly have similar, if not the same, genetic causes and pathways. Studies conducted on the genomes of a plethora of organisms have revealed that many organisms have homologous genes, meaning that some genetic material has been conserved between species. If these organisms shared a common evolutionary ancestor, then this might imply that aspects of behavior can be inherited from previous generations, lending support to the genetic causes – as opposed to the environmental causes – of behavior. Variations in personalities and behavioral traits seen amongst individuals of the same species could be explained by differing levels of expression of these genes and their corresponding proteins.

=== Aggression ===
There is also research being conducted on how an individual's genes can cause varying levels of aggression and aggression control.

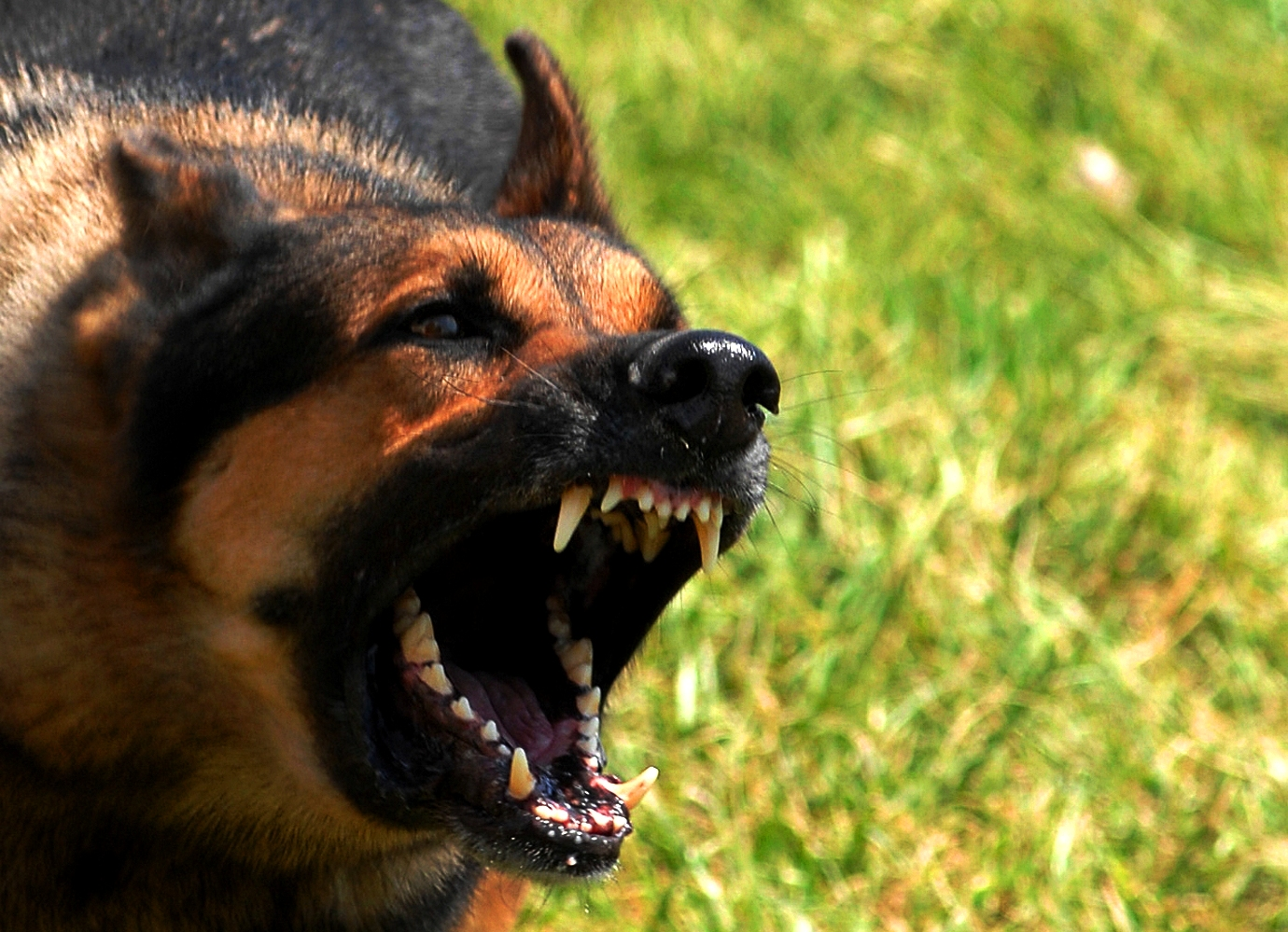
Outward displays of aggression are seen in most animals.

Throughout the animal kingdom, varying styles, types and levels of aggression can be observed leading scientists to believe that there might be a genetic contribution that has conserved this particular behavioral trait. For some species varying levels of aggression have indeed exhibited direct correlation to a higher level of Darwinian fitness.

== Development ==
Shh and BMP gradient in the neural tube

A great deal of research has been done on the effects of genes and the formation of the brain and the central nervous system. The following wiki links may prove helpful:

- Neural development
- Neurogenesis
- The Brain
- Neural tube

There are many genes and proteins that contribute to the formation and development of the central nervous system, many of which can be found in the aforementioned links. Of particular importance are those that code for BMPs, BMP inhibitors and SHH. When expressed during early development, BMP's are responsible for the differentiation of epidermal cells from the ventral ectoderm. Inhibitors of BMPs, such as NOG and CHRD, promote differentiation of ectoderm cells into prospective neural tissue on the dorsal side. If any of these genes are improperly regulated, then proper formation and differentiation will not occur. BMP also plays a very important role in the patterning that occurs after the formation of the neural tube. Due to the graded response the cells of the neural tube have to BMP and Shh signaling, these pathways are in competition to determine the fate of preneural cells. BMP promotes dorsal differentiation of pre-neural cells into sensory neurons and Shh promotes ventral differentiation into motor neurons. There are many other genes that help to determine neural fate and proper development include, RELN, SOX9, WNT, Notch and Delta coding genes, HOX, and various cadherin coding genes like CDH1 and CDH2.

Some recent research has shown that the level of gene expression changes drastically in the brain at different periods throughout the life cycle. For example, during prenatal development the amount of mRNA in the brain (an indicator of gene expression) is exceptionally high, and drops to a significantly lower level not long after birth. The only other point of the life cycle during which expression is this high is during the mid- to late-life period, during 50–70 years of age. While the increased expression during the prenatal period can be explained by the rapid growth and formation of the brain tissue, the reason behind the surge of late-life expression remains a topic of ongoing research.

== Epigenetics and gene regulation ==
Epigenetics is a critical tool in neurogenetics because it influences how genes are expressed without altering the underlying DNA sequence. Mechanisms such as DNA methylation and histone modification regulate gene activity. This shapes synaptic plasticity and neuronal differentiation, as well as memory formation. Exposure to stress or environmental toxins can cause long-term changes in gene expression patterns and contribute to depression or anxiety. Research has shown epigenetic modifications can be passed to offspring, showing how early-life environments have multigenerational effects on brain development. Understanding epigenetic regulation offers valuable insights into how genes and the environment cooperate to shape the nervous system’s structure.

== Gene-environment interaction ==
Gene-environmental interactions are central to explaining why individuals with the same genetic makeup exhibit varied behavioral and neurological outcomes. Gene variants can increase vulnerability to environmental risk factors and protective factors that determine the trajectory of mental illness. Individuals carrying a specific variant of the serotonin transporter gene have vulnerability to depression and chronic stress. Animal research has demonstrated that variations in maternal care influence stress-response genes through epigenetic modifications. Facts support the genetic predisposition theory and its dynamic interaction with the environment. This affects brain development over time. Behavioral genetics studies continue to show that environment and heredity contribute equally to the causation of variation in cognition, emotion, and psychopathology.

== Current research ==
Neurogenetics is a field that is rapidly expanding and growing. The current areas of research are very diverse in their focuses. One area deals with molecular processes and the function of certain proteins, often in conjunction with cell signaling and neurotransmitter release, cell development and repair, or neuronal plasticity. Behavioral and cognitive areas of research continue to expand in an effort to pinpoint contributing genetic factors. As a result of the expanding neurogenetics field a better understanding of specific neurological disorders and phenotypes has arisen with direct correlation to genetic mutations. With severe disorders such as epilepsy, brain malformations, or intellectual disability a single gene or causative condition has been identified 60% of the time; however, the milder the intellectual handicap the lower chance a specific genetic cause has been pinpointed. Autism for example is only linked to a specific, mutated gene about 15–20% of the time while the mildest forms of mental handicaps are only being accounted for genetically less than 5% of the time. Research in neurogenetics has yielded some promising results, though, in that mutations at specific gene loci have been linked to harmful phenotypes and their resulting disorders. For instance a frameshift mutation or a missense mutation at the DCX gene location causes a neuronal migration defect also known as lissencephaly. Another example is the ROBO3 gene where a mutation alters axon length negatively impacting neuronal connections. Horizontal gaze palsy with progressive scoliosis (HGPPS) accompanies a mutation here. These are just a few examples of what current research in the field of neurogenetics has achieved. Neurogenetic advancements have transformed the diagnosis and treatment of neurological and psychiatric disorders. Emerging genetic testing technologies and molecular diagnostics are being increasingly used to identify disease mechanisms, guide personalized treatment, and predict therapeutic response.

=== Gene Therapy and Molecular Interventions ===
Gene-silencing and gene-replacement therapies are among the most promising applications of neurogenetics. A significant milestone in treating motor neuron disorders was the approval of onasemnogene abeparvovec (Zolgensma) for SMA using adeno-associated viral (AAV) vectors. Similarly, antisense oligonucleotide (ASO) therapies like tofersen and nusinersen work by modulating RNA splicing or reducing toxic protein expression in neurodegenerative diseases.

== Ethical considerations ==
As the neurogenetics field expands into behavioral and clinical domains, questions about privacy, consent, discrimination, and the overall implications of genetic modification arise.

=== Equity and access ===
Currently, a significant portion of neurogenetic data is derived from populations of European ancestry, which has led to inequities in the predictive accuracy of genetic tests and risk models across global populations. As a result, an important ethical goal for the field is expanding research diversity and ensuring equal access to genetic therapies.

The hereditary aspect of neurogenetic diseases means that a patient's diagnosis also affects his family, and raising important ethical questions. the Professional ethics require respect of the patient's autonomy: his consent must be both voluntary and informed. It is imperative to rely on the principles of beneficence and non-maleficence for the disclosure of genetic results because of the risk of severe psychological distress (e.g. Huntington). These ethical issues are particularly important when genetic testing are conducted in a context of vulnerability (mental disability) or limited autonomy (early detection in an embryo, child, etc.). or uncertain risk (25%).

The neurological and psychological aspect of neurogenetic diseases amplifies ethical concerns because it directly affects people's identity, self-image, autonomy and ability to discern. This leads to greater social stigma and an increased risk of discrimination. In addition, early detection conflicts patient confidentiality with the duty to inform relatives with genetic risk. Therefore, it is better to postpone this test until adulthood, except in case of preventive measures.

In the field of research, the use of gene editing techniques such as CRISPR-Cas9 requires particular vigilance in order to avoid risks for future generations. In such situation, the International Multidisciplinary Committee recommends authorising experimental editing of the somatic genome (non-hereditary) or the germ genome only if limited to preventing the transmission of a serious disease. Finally, emerging therapeutic applications of neurogenetics, including gene therapy, must be evaluated in the light of bioethics principles: beneficence, non-maleficence, autonomy, and justice.

== Future directions ==
Ethical frameworks for neurogenetics continue to integrate perspectives from bioethics, neuroscience, law, and public policy. In order to balance innovation with respect for human rights as genetic technologies evolve, ongoing public dialogue and transparent oversight will be necessary.

== See also ==
- Neurogenomics
- Neuropsychology
- Behavioral genetics
- Psychiatric genetics
- Cognitive genomics
- International Behavioural and Neural Genetics Society

Journals

- Genes, Brain and Behavior
- Journal of Neurogenetics
- Neurogenetics
