= International Behavioural and Neural Genetics Society =

- Abbreviation: IBANGS
- Formation: July 1, 1996; 30 years ago
- Legal status: Association
- Purpose: To promote the field of neurobehavioural genetics
- Region served: Worldwide
- Members: 200
- Official language: English
- President: Paul Meyer
- Main organ: Executive Committee
- Website: www.ibangs.org

The International Behavioural and Neural Genetics Society (IBANGS) is a learned society that was founded in 1996. The goal of IBANGS is "promote and facilitate the growth of research in the field of neural behavioral genetics".

== Profile ==
=== Mission ===
The IBANGS mission statement is to promote the field of neurobehavioural genetics by:

- organizing annual meetings to promote excellence in research on behavioural and neural genetics
- publishing a scholarly journal, Genes, Brain and Behavior in collaboration with Wiley-Blackwell

=== Awards ===
Each year IBANGS recognizes top scientists in the field of neurobehavioral genetics with:

- The IBANGS Distinguished Investigator Award for distinguished lifetime contributions to behavioral neurogenetics
- The IBANGS Young Scientist Award for promising young scientists
- Travel Awards to attend an IBANGS Annual Meeting for students, postdocs, and junior faculty, financed by a meeting grant from the National Institute on Alcohol Abuse and Alcoholism

A Distinguished Service Award for exceptional contributions to the field is given on a more irregular basis and as of 2020 has been awarded only three times, to Benson Ginsburg (2001), Wim Crusio (2011), and John C. Crabbe (2015).

== History ==
IBANGS was founded in 1996 as the European Behavioural and Neural Genetics Society, with Hans-Peter Lipp as its founding president. The name and scope of EBANGS were changed to "International" at the first meeting of the society in Orléans, France in 1997. IBANGS is a founding member of the Federation of European Neuroscience Societies.

The current president is Paul Meyer (2025–2026). Previous presidents have been:

- Megan Mulligan (2024-2025)
- Karla R. Kaun (2023-2024)
- Judy Grisel (2022–2023)
- Camron Bryant (2021-2022)
- Karl J. Clark (2020–2021)
- Cathy Fernandez (2019–2020)
- Catharine Rankin (2018–2019)
- Marissa Ehringer (2017–2028)
- Elissa J. Chesler (2016–2017)
- Leo Schalkwyk (2015–2016)
- Lisa Tarantino (2014–2015)
- Abraham Palmer (2013–2014)
- Josh Dubnau (2012–2013)
- Mary-Anne Enoch (2011–2012)
- Richard Brown (2010–2011)
- Jacqueline Crawley (2009–2010)
- Christopher Janus (2008–2009)
- Dan Goldowitz (2007–2008)
- Tamara J. Phillips (2006–2007)
- Hee-Sup Shin (2005–2006)
- Robert W. Williams (2004–2005)
- Mara Dierssen (2003–2004)
- John C. Crabbe (2002–2003)
- Fred van Leuven (2001–2002)
- Douglas Wahlsten (2000–2001)
- Wim E. Crusio (1999–2000)
- Hans-Peter Lipp (1996–1999)
