= Neurogenetics (journal) =

- Discipline: Neurogenetics
- Language: English
- Edited by: U. Müller, M.B. Graeber, Louis J. Ptáček

Publication details
- History: 1997-present
- Publisher: Springer Science+Business Media
- Frequency: Quarterly
- Impact factor: 2.660 (2020)

Standard abbreviations
- ISO 4: Neurogenetics

Indexing
- CODEN: NEROFX
- ISSN: 1364-6745 (print); 1364-6753 (web)
- OCLC no.: 37360267

Links
- Journal homepage; Online archive

Neurogenetics is a quarterly peer-reviewed scientific journal covering the field of neurogenetics. It was established in 1997 and is published quarterly by Springer Science+Business Media. The journal publishes review articles, original articles, short communications, and letters to the editors. The editors-in-chief are Ulrich Müller (University of Giessen), Manuel B. Graeber (University of Sydney), and Louis J. Ptáček (University of California, San Francisco).

== Abstracting and indexing ==
The journal is abstracted and indexed in Academic OneFile, Biological Abstracts, BIOSIS Previews, Chemical Abstracts Service, ProQuest databases, Embase, Neuroscience Citation Index, PASCAL, PubMed/MEDLINE, Science Citation Index Expanded, Scopus, and VINITI Database RAS. According to the Journal Citation Reports, the journal has a 2020 impact factor of 2.660.
