= Behavioural Brain Research =

- Discipline: Behavioural neuroscience
- Language: English
- Edited by: Christine A. Rabinak, Christian P. Müller

Publication details
- History: 1980–present
- Publisher: Elsevier
- Frequency: 20/year
- Impact factor: 3.332 (2020)

Standard abbreviations
- ISO 4: Behav. Brain Res.

Indexing
- CODEN: BBREDI
- ISSN: 0166-4328 (print); 1872-7549 (web)
- OCLC no.: 06183451

Links
- Journal homepage; Online access

Behavioural Brain Research is a peer-reviewed scientific journal published by Elsevier. The journal publishes articles in the field of behavioural neuroscience. Volume 1 appeared in 1980 and issues appeared 6 times per year; as submissions increased it switched to a higher frequency and currently 20 issues per year are published.

== Abstracting and indexing ==
The journal is abstracted and indexed in Animal Behavior Abstracts, BIOSIS Previews, Chemical Abstracts Service, Current Contents/Life Sciences, EMBASE, MEDLINE, PsycINFO, Science Citation Index, and Scopus. According to the Journal Citation Reports, its 2020 impact factor is 3.332.
