= Sandra Scarr =

American psychologist and writer (1936–2021)

Sandra Wood Scarr
- Born: August 8, 1936; Washington, D.C., U.S.
- Died: October 8, 2021 (aged 85); Holualoa, Hawaii, U.S.
- Education: Vassar College (AB); Harvard University (PhD)
- Known for: Heritability of IQ, race and intelligence
- Scientific career
- Fields: Developmental psychology, behavioral genetics
- Workplaces: University of Maryland; University of Pennsylvania; University of Minnesota; Yale University; University of Virginia
- Doctoral advisor: Irving Gottesman

Sandra Wood Scarr (August 8, 1936 – October 8, 2021) was an American psychologist and writer. She was the first female full professor in psychology in the history of Yale University. She established core resources for the study of development, including the Minnesota Transracial Adoption Study and the Minnesota Adolescent Adoption Study. She served as president of multiple societies including the Association for Psychological Science and was honored with multiple awards including the James McKeen Cattell Fellow Award. She was also active in the development of commercial childcare. Her work with twins in the 1960s revealed strong genetic influences on intellectual development. One of her key findings was that this differed with race and socioeconomic status (SES), with poor and non-white children showing less genetic influence on their IQ and more environmental influence. She demonstrated a successful intervention in premature infants, showing that stimulation improved their health and developmental outcomes.

At Minnesota, she and Richard A. Weinberg found that black and interracial children adopted early into white homes initially had outcomes more similar to the white average, suggesting a role of family environment early in life. By their teens, adoptees with two black birth parents achieved lower scores than did adoptees with one or no black birth parents, which some have argued suggests a genetic component to race differences in IQ.

Along with the Scarr-Rowe effect of socio-economic status on the heritability of intelligence, another key intellectual landmark established by Scarr was that "Rather than the home environment having a cumulative impact across development, its influence wanes from early childhood to adolescence." She sought also to advance scientific psychology, and in 1991 co-founded Current Directions In Psychological Science. She retired to Hawaii.

== Early life and education ==
Scarr was the child of school teacher Jane Powell Wood and John Ruxton Wood, a US Army physician, who in 1942 was appointed director of Army Research Laboratories at Edgewood Arsenal and who in 1950 headed the Walter Reed Army Institute of Research. Scarr spent most of her childhood in the Chesapeake Bay area and went to the Bryn Mawr School for Girls and the National Cathedral School. After completing her undergraduate studies at Vassar College in 1958, where she was involved in undergraduate research with Harriet Zuckerman, Scarr worked for a couple of years first at a family and child service and then at National Institute of Mental Health as a research assistant. In 1960 she enrolled at Harvard University, from where she earned her Ph.D. in psychology in 1965, specializing in developmental psychology and behavioural genetics. During graduate school, she married fellow sociology student Harry Scarr with whom she has a son, Phillip (1962).

== Early career and research ==
Though she initially had a difficult time finding a job because she had a child, she eventually taught at the University of Maryland, the University of Pennsylvania, the University of Minnesota, and Yale University. She was the first woman full professor in psychology in the history of Yale University. In 1983, she accepted a position as Commonwealth Professor and chair of the psychology department at the University of Virginia, where she remained until her retirement.

In the 1960s, Scarr studied identical and fraternal twins' aptitude and school achievement scores. The study revealed that intellectual development was heavily influenced by genetic ability, especially among more advantaged children. It also showed that on average, black children demonstrated less genetic and more environmental influence on their intelligence than white children. Scarr also collaborated with Margaret Williams on a clinical study which demonstrated that premature birth infants who receive stimulation gain weight faster and recover faster than babies left in isolation (the practice at that time).

In 1972 she married fellow researcher Philip Salapatek, with whom she also coauthored papers. They had a daughter, Stephanie (November 1973). They moved to Minnesota, where Scarr started working with Richard A. Weinberg, on the Minnesota Transracial Adoption Study. This study concluded that black and interracial children adopted early into white homes had IQ and school achievement scores that averaged similar to those of white children.

In another adoption study, Minnesota Adolescent Adoption Study, Scarr and Weinberg showed that adolescents, adopted in the first few months of life, did not resemble their adoptive parents or other children adopted into the same family. In Scarr's words: "Rather than the home environment having a cumulative impact across development, its influence wanes from early childhood to adolescence." (emphasis in original). As of 1995, the study was among the largest of its kind in the United States, together with the Colorado Adoption Project and the Texas Adoption Project; its results had seen some replication.

== Research awards ==
Scarr was honored by her colleagues with research awards: Distinguished Contributions to Research on Public Policy (American Psychological Association), James McKeen Cattell Award (Association for Psychological Science), and the Dobzhansky Award for Lifetime Achievement (Behavior Genetics Association). She was elected a Fellow of the American Academy of Arts and Sciences, American Association for the Advancement of Science, and other scientific societies. Scarr served as president of the Society for Research in Child Development, the Association for Psychological Science, the Council of Graduate Departments of Psychology, and the Behavior Genetics Association. She was elected to the American Psychological Association's Board of Directors in 1988, but resigned in 1990. Scarr was also a founding member of the American Psychological Society (now the Association for Psychological Science) and was chief executive officer of KinderCare Learning Centers from 1995 to 1997.

== Involvement with KinderCare ==
In 1990, Scarr was invited to join the Board of the KinderCare Learning Centers, the nation's largest child care company. In 1993, she was elected chairman of the board and in 1995 became CEO and chairman of KinderCare. While at KinderCare, Scarr instituted NAEYC accreditation for the centers and worked to improve the wages and working conditions of center staffs. In 1997, KinderCare was bought by Kohlberg, Kravitz, and Roberts Investments, and Scarr retired

== Late career ==
In 1991, together with C. Randy Gallistel she co-founded the journal Current Directions In Psychological Science. In 1995, she was a signatory of a collective statement titled "Mainstream Science on Intelligence", written by Linda Gottfredson and published in The Wall Street Journal. Scarr wrote a mixed review of The Bell Curve, agreeing with the general presentation of the data, disagreeing about some specific issues of interpretation, and disapproving of the book's policy recommendations. Scarr also disapproved of Hans Eysenck's book Race, Intelligence and Education, which she described as "generally inflammatory" and insulting to "almost everyone except WASPs and Jews".

In 1991, together with Claire Ernhart, Scarr was involved as an expert witness on behalf of the lead industry in the lawsuit United States v. Sharon Steel Corp., on the opposite side of Herbert Needleman who was testifying for the U.S. Justice Department owing to his research on the relationship between lead exposure and IQ. The federal court asked Scarr and Ernhart to examine the research of Herbert Needleman to determine whether or not it supported his claims. After reviewing his data collection and analyses, Scarr and Ernhart filed charges of scientific misconduct against Needleman with the National Institutes of Health. NIH forwarded the complaint to the University of Pittsburgh, which found that Needleman did not "fabricate, falsify or plagiarize", but a Preliminary Inquiry Panel said it could not exclude the possibility that "misrepresentation" had occurred. When the trial was declared open to the public, Scarr initially refused to come and later when she was persuaded she constantly refused to answer questions. Scarr received money from the lead industry for consulting services which creates a conflict of interest.

== Retirement ==
Scarr retired to Hawaii in 1997, where she learned scuba diving, even obtaining a rescue diver certification. She also traveled "a lot, especially on cruise ships".

== Death ==
Scarr died on October 8, 2021, in Holualoa, Hawaii.

== Publications ==
- Scarr S. Understanding Development. Harcourt (1986) ISBN 0-15-592864-3
- Scarr S. Understanding Psychology. Random House Inc (T); 5th edition (1987). ISBN 0-07-555247-7
- Scarr S. Socialization (Merrill sociology series). C. E. Merrill Pub. Co (1973). ISBN 0-675-09039-3
- Lande JS, Scarr S. Caring for Children: Challenge to America. Lea (1989). ISBN 0-8058-0255-X
- Scarr S. Mother care/other care (A Pelican book). Penguin Books; 2nd ed edition (1987). ISBN 0-14-022760-1
- Scarr S. Psychology and Children: Current Research and Practice. Amer Psychological Assn; Reprint edition (1979). ISBN 0-912704-59-4
- Scarr S. Genetic effects on human behavior: Recent family studies (Master lectures on brain-behavior relationships). American Psychological Association (1977). ASIN: B0006Y2RV0
- Scarr S. Genetics and the development of intelligence. University of Chicago Press (1975). ISBN 0-226-35354-0

== Publications about Scarr ==
- McCartney, Kathleen; Weinberg, Richard A., eds. (25 June 2009). Experience and Development: A Festschrift in Honor of Sandra Wood Scarr. Sandra Scarr (epilogue). Psychology Press. ISBN 978-1-84872-847-9. Archived from the original on 20 December 2014.
