= Scarr–Rowe effect =

Hypothesized effect of socioeconomic status on the heritability of IQ

In behavioral genetics, the Scarr–Rowe effect, also known as the Scarr–Rowe hypothesis, refers to the proposed moderating effect of low socioeconomic status on the heritability of children's IQ. According to this hypothesis, lower socioeconomic status and greater exposure to social disadvantage during childhood leads to a decrease in the heritability of IQ, as compared to children raised in more advantaged environments. It is considered an example of gene–environment interaction. This hypothesized effect was first proposed by Sandra Scarr, who found support for it in a 1971 study of twins in Philadelphia, and these results were replicated by David C. Rowe in 1999. Since then, similar results have been replicated numerous times, though not all replication studies have yielded positive results. A 2015 meta-analysis found that the effect was predominant in the United States while less evident in societies with robust child welfare systems.

== Original research ==
In Sandra Scarr's original work, she outlines the methods behind the study of genetic and environmental variance, using data from the 1960 US Census tract to estimate Socioeconomic status (SES), and the Iowa Tests of Basic Skills to study genetic and environmental variations across children from advantaged and disadvantaged populations. This study focussed on the heritability of IQ based on social class and race, with the social and racial groups being too variated to make generalizations between groups questionable. Across both races, the total variance was generally found to be greater in the groups of higher socioeconomic status. It is suggested that, while genetic factors are not as significant in determining aptitude in lower SES groups of either race, there is a larger variance in phenotypes among higher SES children.

One of the major limitations of Scarr's original work is that the sample of twins was separated into same-sex and opposite-sex as opposed to monozygotic (MZ) and dizygotic (DZ), a method which undermined the statistical power of this study.

== Replication research ==
=== Fischbein – 1980 ===
Fischbein used data from a longitudinal study started from the Department of Educational Research at the Stockholm Institute of Education, with twins from 40 of the largest cities and towns in Sweden. An estimation of Socioeconomic status (SES) was taken from the parents' occupation and family income, and scores were gathered from the sample using a differential ability test (DBA) that included a verbal ability test, inductive reasoning test, and a clerical speed test. The clerical speed test showed insignificant differences between the social groups. Heritability of all variables tested, including IQ, was significantly higher in the higher SES group compared to the lower SES group, which presented the lowest heritability.

=== Rowe – 1999 ===
David C. Rowe's work looks at the influence of genetic and environmental factors specifically on the variation of verbal IQ, with data from the 1909 sibling pairs from the National Longitudinal Study of Adolescent Health. Parental education level was used as a moderator for this study. It was found that verbal IQ was highly heritable among children whose parents had a higher level of education, by being similar to the earlier studies of Fischbein and Scarr-Salapatek, this adds support to the hypothesis of variance in IQ heritability at different levels of socioeconomic status. It is acknowledged that the level of parental education is likely to be influenced by genetic factors, with higher-educated parents passing on a higher level of IQ.

=== Additional research ===
In 2003, Eric Turkheimer and colleagues replicated the effect in an analysis of the National Collaborative Perinatal Project. Medical, psychological, and SES data were collected for children at 8 months, 1 year, 4 years, and 7 years; at age 7 they completed the Wechsler Intelligence Scale for Children (WISC). The mothers' SES data were collected at their registration in the study and again at the end of the 7-year study. The study found that the variance in IQ in relation to SES displayed a non-linear relationship, suggesting that children from low SES families may have environmental and genetic differences, and differences in poorer environments are likely to contribute more to variations in genetic outcome than differences in higher SES environments.

McLloyd's 1998 study looked at socioeconomic disadvantage and the impact it could have on child development as a whole, IQ being included. This provided a separation of socioeconomic disadvantage into two types of poverty: persistent and transitory. These were then compared to an advantageous socioeconomic status. Persistent poverty was shown to have the worst impact on IQ, as well as other aspects of child development when compared to transitory poverty and children who never experience poverty. This study acknowledged other variables that were likely to be associated with a low SES (for example chronic stress, harsh and inconsistent parenting, etc.).

==== Application beyond the USA ====
While there have been many replications, the Scarr–Rowe effect has primarily been studied in American samples and has been less applicable in European samples; this is likely due to more even access to economic resources, including educational, limiting poverty. In 2019, a study of German twins by Gottschling tested the heritability of cognitive ability at three mean age points – 11, 17, and 23 years old. It was found that, in the younger cohorts of 11 and 17, higher SES could be correlated with a significantly higher mean level of cognitive ability. This provided support for the original study during childhood and adolescence, although not to quite the same degree.

==== The Scarr–Rowe effect in adulthood ====
The original theory hypothesizes that higher SES will be associated with greater heritability of IQ, very few studies have addressed this interaction within adult populations. Evidence from Gottschling's 2019 study suggests that the influence of the SES of a family as a moderator for IQ heritability changes as people get older – with results showing the effect being less significant in adolescence and not shown present in adulthood. A 2015 meta-analysis of 14 studies found similar evidence that the Scarr–Rowe effect diminishes with age.

==== Limitations and contradictory findings ====
The same 2015 meta-analysis found evidence of the Scarr–Rowe effect only in the United States, but no evidence of such an effect in Australia or Western Europe. Turkheimer et al. (2015) similarly note that the effect has been replicated more in the United States than in other countries, and that even in the United States some studies have failed to replicate it. Based on their analysis of the Louisville Twin Study, they reported weak evidence for the hypothesis that was not statistically significant. A 2016 study in Australia found no evidence for the Scarr–Rowe effect.

In 2017, a twin study with a sample of 24,620 twins and 274,786 siblings born and raised in the economically diverse US state of Florida also found no evidence of the Scarr–Rowe effect.

== See also ==
- Intelligence Quotient
- Behavioural Genetics
