= Lee Willerman =

American psychologist (1939-1997)

- Born: Lee Willerman; 26 July 1939; Chicago, Illinois, U.S.
- Died: 10 January 1997 (aged 57)
- Education: Wayne State University
- Known for: Twin study
- Scientific career
- Fields: Psychometrics, behavioral genetics
- Workplaces: National Institutes of Health, University of Texas at Austin

Lee Willerman (26 July 1939 – 10 January 1997) was an American psychologist known for his work on behavioral genetics using twin studies.

== Biography ==
Willerman was born and grew up in Chicago. Willerman received a BA and MA degrees from Roosevelt University in 1961 and 1964, respectively, and his Ph.D. from Wayne State University in 1967. After a three-year stint at the National Institutes of Health, Willerman completed a post-doctoral year at the University of Michigan in the Department of Human Genetics. In 1971, he took a position at the University of Texas at Austin, where he remained until his death.

In 1974, Willerman joined the American Eugenics Society at a time when this society had already moved away from eugenics and towards the study of medical genetics, behavior genetics, and social biology. He was also an active member of the Behavior Genetics Association, and his work over the remainder of his life involved behavior genetics. His first study examined IQ and birth weight differences between identical twins, finding that the twin who had been heavier at birth tended to have a higher IQ. Willerman worked with Joseph M. Horn and John C. Loehlin on a major study of adoptive families, the Texas Adoption Project. Much of his work involved psychometrics and research into neuroanatomical predictors of intelligence.

In 1994, he was one of 52 signatories on "Mainstream Science on Intelligence," an editorial written by Linda Gottfredson and published in the Wall Street Journal, which claimed to represent academic consensus on issues related to intelligence research following the publication of The Bell Curve.

== Bibliography ==
=== Books ===
- Psychology of Individual and Group Differences (1979) ISBN 978-0-716-70292-4
- Psychopathology, together with David B. Cohen (1989), ISBN 978-0-070-70311-7
