= Daphne Martschenko =

American rower

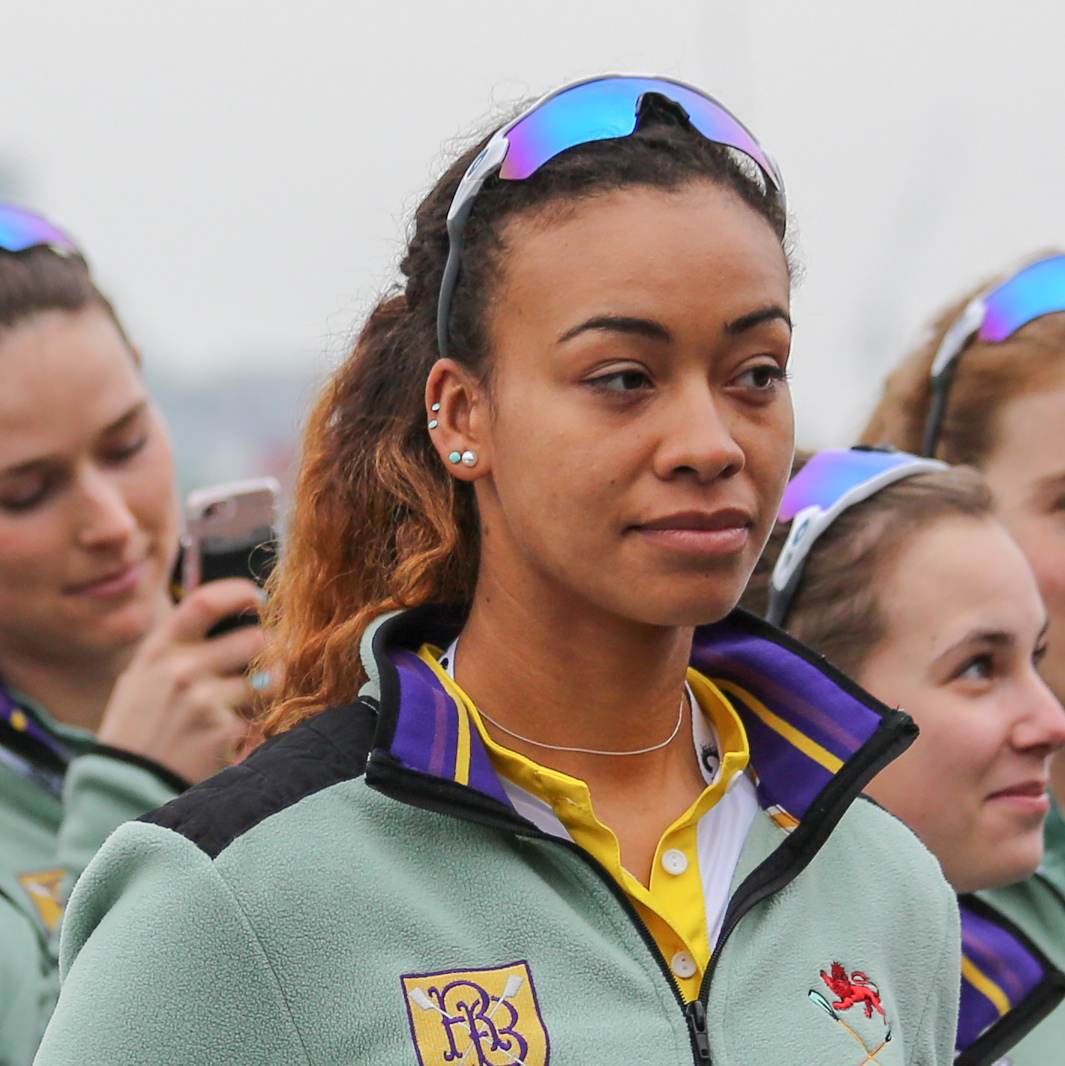
Martschenko at the Boat Race of 2018

Daphne Oluwaseun Martschenko (born November 6, 1992 in London) is an American academic, teaching Biomedical Ethics at Stanford University. She is also a former rower who competed in the Oxford-Cambridge Boat Race and represented the United States at two World Rowing U23 Championships.

== Early life and education ==
Martschenko was born in London, to a Ukrainian father who was a U.S. foreign service officer, and a Nigerian mother. She has three sisters.

She lived in Kyrgyzstan, Russia, and Ukraine while young. She attended Oakton High School in Vienna, Virginia, where she was a member the crew team her freshman year. She later attended Stanford University in Stanford, California, where she majored in Slavic languages and anthropology. In 2014, she enrolled at the University of Cambridge, where she successfully defended her PhD, focused on the impact of behavioral genetics on the education system.

== Rowing career ==
While at Stanford, she earned two gold medals, one in the NCAA Division I Rowing Championship. She represented the United States at two World Rowing U23 Championships. While at the University of Cambridge, she competed in the Oxford-Cambridge Boat Race and was elected president of the Cambridge University Women's Boat Club for the 2018 boat race campaign.

== Academic career ==
She is currently an assistant professor at the Stanford Center for Biomedical Ethics. Her work focuses on the ethical and social implications of human genetic research.

Ιn April 2022, The New York Review of Books published a review by Martschenko and Marcus Feldman that was highly critical of Kathryn Paige Harden's The Genetic Lottery, initiating an exchange of letters to the publication.

== Selected works ==
Martschenko DO; Wand H; Young JL; Wojcik GL. (2023) Including multiracial individuals is crucial for race, ethnicity and ancestry frameworks in genetics and genomics. Nature Genetics.

Martschenko DO, Callier SL, Garrison NA, Lee SS, Turley P, Meyer MN, Parens E. (2023) Wrestling with Public Input on an Ethical Analysis of Scientific Research. The Hastings Center Report.

Sabatello M, Martschenko DO, Cho MK, Brothers KB. (2022) Data sharing and community-engaged research. Science.

Martschenko DO, Trejo S. (2021) Ethical, anticipatory genomics research on human behavior means celebrating disagreement. Human Genetics and Genomics Advances
