= The Gloomy Prospect =

In behavioral genetics and epidemiology, the "Gloomy Prospect" refers to the notion that non-shared environmental influences are unsystematic, idiosyncratic, serendipitous events. It is generally used to describe the messy and individualized tiny and innumerable, but causal environmental effects. It can also be used as a label.

The phrase, "gloomy prospect", was coined in a paper by Plomin and Daniels (1987), a review of biometric family studies, which intended to study why there existed such a large variation of traits of siblings despite being within the same family. They explain that, "One gloomy prospect is that the salient environment might be unsystematic, idiosyncratic, or serendipitous events such as accidents, illnesses, and other traumas, as biographies often attest... It is possible that nonshared environmental influences could be unsystematic in the sense of stochastic events that, when compounded over time, make children in the same family different in unpredictable ways"

Turkheimer and Waldron (2000) conducted a meta-analysis on the influx of new literature inspired by Plomin and Daniels (1987) regarding the systematic effects of environmental differences within families. The authors conclude in support of the gloomy prospect that their "quantitative review shows that measured nonshared environmental variables do not account for a substantial portion of the nonshared variability posited by biometric studies of behavior". In The Three Laws of Behavioral Genetics, from Turkheimer (2000), it states that "The gloomy prospect is true. Non-shared environmental variability predominates not because of the systematic effects of environmental events that are not shared among siblings, but rather because of the unsystematic effects of all environmental events, compounded by the equally unsystematic processes that expose us to environmental events in the first place."

Smith (2011) brings the gloomy prospect with epidemiology as an underlying mechanism of chance events. While he suggests that epidemiologists should embrace randomness in population health research and practice, he also noted that what seemed random at one level might be predictable at a different level. However, the utility of embracing the gloomy prospect in epidemiology is not supported universally.

== See also ==
- Behavioural genetics
- Twin study
