= Minnesota Transracial Adoption Study =

Minnesota research project

The Minnesota Transracial Adoption Study examined the IQ test scores of 130 black or interracial children adopted by advantaged white families. It has been a focus for controversy in the debate over race and intelligence.

The aim of the study was to determine the contribution of environmental and genetic factors to the average underperformance of black children on IQ tests as compared to white children. The initial study was published in 1976 by Sandra Scarr and Richard A. Weinberg. A follow-up study was published in 1992 by Richard Weinberg, Sandra Scarr and Irwin D. Waldman. Another related study investigating social adjustment in a subsample of the adopted black children was published in 1996. The 1992 follow-up study concluded that "social environment maintains a dominant role in determining the average IQ level of black and interracial children and that both social and genetic variables contribute to individual variations among them."

In 1994, researchers such as Levin and Lynn argued that these findings supported the view that genetics is a determinant of average differences in IQ test performance between races, while other researchers, including Weinberg, Scarr and Waldman, argued that the findings aligned with environmental explanations, noting that the IQ scores of the black children were slightly higher than the national average. The idea that there are genetically determined differences in intelligence between racial groups is now considered discredited by mainstream science, largely due to subsequent developments in genetics research.

== Background and study design ==
On measures of cognitive ability (IQ tests) and school performance, black children in the U.S. have performed worse than white children. At the time of the study, the gap in average performance between the two groups of children was approximately one standard deviation, which is equivalent to about 15 IQ points or 4 grade levels at high school graduation. Thus, the average IQ score of black children in the U.S. was approximately 85, compared to the average score of white children of 100. No detectable bias due to test construction or administration had been found, although this does not rule out other biases. The gap is functionally significant, which makes it an important area of study. The Minnesota Transracial Adoption Study tried to answer whether the gap is primarily caused by genetic factors or whether it is primarily caused by environmental and cultural factors.

The study was funded by the Grant Foundation and the National Institute of Child Health and Human Development.

By examining the cognitive ability and school performance of both black and white children adopted into white families, the study intended to separate genetic factors from rearing conditions as causal influences in the gap. "Trans racial adoption is the human analog of the cross-fostering design, commonly used in animal behavior genetics research.... There is no question that adoption constitutes a massive intervention" (Scarr & Weinberg, 1976, p. 726).

Scarr and Weinberg studied black, white, Asian, indigenous American, and mixed-race black/white children adopted by upper-middle-class white families in Minnesota. The average IQ of the adopting parents was more than one standard deviation above the population mean of 100. The biological children of these parents were also tested. The sample of adopted children was selected by eligible parents contacting the researchers for participating following a newsletter call. The geographical origin of the adopted children was not uniform. All except one white adopted child was adopted in-state. Black and interracial children came from twelve states; Asian and indigenous American children came from Minnesota as well as from Korea, Vietnam, Canada and Ecuador.

As Scarr & Weinberg (1976) note, transracial adoption studies only control for family environment, not social environment. For example, children who are socially identified as black may still be subject to racial discrimination despite being raised by white parents. Yet, it was previously known that adoption into upper-middle class white families has a positive influence on the IQ and school performance of white children.

The study showed significant differences in adoption patterns of mixed-race black/white and black adopted children as was noted by Scarr and Weinberg (1976):

It is essential to note, however, that the groups also differed significantly (p < .05) in their placement histories and natural mother's education. Children with two black parents were significantly older at adoption, had been in the adoptive home a shorter time, and had experienced a greater number of preadoption placements. The natural parents of the black/black group also averaged a year less of education than those of the black/white group, which suggests an average difference between the groups in intellectual ability. There were also significant differences between the adoptive families of black/black and black/white children in father's education and mother's IQ.

== Results ==
The children were first tested in 1975 at age 7. In 1985, 196 of the original 265 children were retested at age 17. The data showed mixed adoptees scoring slightly lower than white adoptees with gaps of 3 and 7 points at ages 7 and 17, while black adoptees scored 15 and 17 points below white adoptees at ages 7 and 17. However, the black, white and mixed race children did not have demographically identical adoptive parents. As the authors explain:

There were also significant differences between the adoptive families of black/black and black/white children in father's education and mother's IQ. ... [T]he children with two black parents had poorer histories and had natural and adoptive parents with lower educational levels and abilities. ... [T]hese characteristics largely account for the IQ differences between black children with one or two black parents.

The adopting parents of 12 of the interracial children wrongly believed that their adopted children had two black parents. The average IQ of these 12 children was not significantly different from the scores of the 56 interracial children correctly classified by their adoptive parents as having one black and one white parent.

Some have suggested that differing pre-adoption experiences, including age at adoption, explain the racial patterns in the results. Lee (2009) argues against this interpretation, saying that there is no evidence from other studies that variables such as age at adoption exert an effect on IQ lasting until late adolescence. In the Minnesota study, the proportion of IQ variance associated with pre-adoption variables declined from .32 to .13 between ages 7 and 17.

The average difference in IQ scores between the testing at age 7 and testing at age 17, seen in all groups, may be due to the use of different IQ tests. The original study used Stanford–Binet Form L-M, WISC or WAIS tests, depending on age, while the follow-up used WISC-R or WAIS-R. Weinberg, Scarr and Waldman describe the effect of this change in test:

Declines in IQ scores have been documented when individuals are retested on a revised form of an original measure, as well as when a test used at a first administration was normed earlier than a test used at a subsequent administration (see Flynn, 1984, for a review). For example, the decline in Full-Scale IQ score from the WAIS to the WAIS-R averaged 6.8 points across a number of studies (reviewed by Sattler, 1988) and was 7.5 points in a sample of 72 35- to 44-year-olds tested as part of the standardization of the WAIS-R (Wechsler, 1981). This is precisely the test combination used for adoptive parents in our study.

Furthermore, the data needed to be corrected for the Flynn effect as stated by Ulrich Neisser:

Everyone involved in this debate is well-aware that such comparisons must be corrected for the Flynn effect: Mean scores on all standard IQ tests seem to rise steadily at about 0.3 points per year. In the Minnesota study, where the tests used in the follow-up were generally not the same as those that had been given the first time, these corrections are complex and must be made on an individual basis. Until they have been made–Waldman et al. reported that they are in progress–raw figures like those above are relatively meaningless.

The data, corrected for the Flynn effect, was published in 2000 by John Loehlin in the Handbook of Intelligence. The data showed mixed adoptees scoring lower than white adoptees with gaps of 6.1 and 8.3 points at ages 7 and 17, while black adoptees scored 20.1 and 17.8 points below white adoptees at ages 7 and 17.

Children's background	Number of Children	Age 7 Corrected IQ	Age 17 Corrected IQ
Non adopted, with two white biological parents	101	110.5	105.5
Adopted, with two white biological parents	16	111.5	101.5
Adopted, with one white and one black biological parent	55	105.4	93.2
Adopted, Asian or indigenous American parents	12	96.1	91.2
Adopted, with two black biological parents	21	91.4	83.7

The analysis of structured interviews at age 7 and 17 reported by (DeBerry, Scarr & Weinberg 1996) found that about half of the studied black adopted children had adjustment difficulties. They had difficulties becoming competent in both European and African-American reference group orientation but had stronger affinity with the European than with the African-American group. Stronger identification with one or the other group predicted better adjustment.

== Interpretations ==
Scarr and Weinberg (1976) interpreted the results from age 7 suggesting that racial group differences in IQ are inconclusive because of confounding in the study. They noted, however, that the study indicated that cross-racial adoption had a positive effect on black-adopted children. In support of this interpretation, they drew special attention to the finding that the average IQ of "socially classified" black children was greater than that of the U.S. white mean. Follow-up data were collected in 1986, and Weinberg et al. published their findings in 1992, arguing that this follow-up data supported Scarr and Weinberg's original conclusions.

Both Levin and Lynn argued that the data support a hereditarian alternative - that the mean IQ scores and school achievement of each group reflected their degree of Sub-Saharan African ancestry. For all measures, the children with two black parents scored lower than the children with one black and white parent, who in turn scored lower than the adopted children with two white parents. Both omitted discussion of Asian adoptees.

Waldman, Weinberg, and Scarr responded to Levin and Lynn. They noted that the data taken of adoption placement effects can explain the observed differences but that they cannot make that claim firmly because the pre-adoption factors confounded racial ancestry, preventing an unambiguous interpretation of the results. They also note that Asian data fit that hypothesis while being omitted by both Levin and Lynn. They argued that, "contrary to Levin's and Lynn's assertions, results from the Minnesota Transracial Adoption Study provide little or no conclusive evidence for genetic influences underlying racial differences in intelligence and achievement, " and noted that, "We think that it is exceedingly implausible that these differences are either entirely genetically based or entirely environmentally based. The true causes of racial-group differences in IQ, or in any other characteristic, are likely to be too complex to be captured by locating them on a single hereditarianism-environmentalism dimension."

In a 1998 article, Scarr wrote, "The test performance of the Black/Black adoptees [in the study] was not different from that of ordinary Black children reared by their own families in the same area of the country. My colleagues and I reported the data accurately and as fully as possible, and then tried to make the results palatable to environmentally committed colleagues. In retrospect, this was a mistake. The results of the transracial adoption study can be used to support either a genetic difference hypothesis or an environmental difference one (because the children have visible African ancestry). We should have been agnostic on the conclusions . . ." Later opinions supported Scarr's reassessment. For example, one group of authors wrote, "Generally, scholars in the field of intelligence see the evidence from this study . . . as consistent with both environmental and genetic hypotheses for the cause of Group IQ score differences . . ."

Loehlin (2000) reiterates the confounding problems of the study and notes that both genetic and environmental interpretations are possible. He further offers another possible explanation of the results, namely unequal prenatal factors: "[O]ne possibility lies in the prenatal environment provided by Black and White biological mothers. The Black-Black group, of course, all had Black mothers. In the Black-White group, virtually all of the birth mothers were White (66 of 68). Willerman and his colleagues found that in interracial couples it made a difference whether the mother was Black or White: The children obtained higher IQs if she was White. They suspected that this difference was due to postnatal environment, but it could, of course, have been in the prenatal one."

A paper from Drew Thomas (2016) found that once corrected for the Flynn effect and attrition in the low IQ white adoptees, the MTRA data showed mixed adoptees scoring slightly lower than white adoptees with a gap of 2.5 points at age 7 and 3.5 at age 17, while black adoptees scored 12.2 and 11.7 points below white adoptees at ages 7 and 17; however, with confidence intervals on the order of ±3 points, these should be taken as rough estimates. Thomas believes that the black-white gap may be explained by differences in pre-adoption environment and age at adoption.

== See also ==
- Interracial adoption
- Twin study
- Eyferth study
- Heritability of IQ
