= Elliot Tucker-Drob =

American psychologist

- Born: Elliot Max Tucker-Drob
- Education: Cornell University; University of Virginia
- Spouse: Kathryn Paige Harden (m. 2010–2017) Barbara Ann Wendelberger Drob (m. 2021)
- Awards: Max Planck-Humboldt Medal (2019); Jacobs Foundation Research Fellowship (2018–2020); Fellow of the Association for Psychological Science (2017); Janet Taylor Spence Award (2017); Fuller and Scott Award (2015)
- Scientific career
- Fields: Developmental psychology Cognitive aging Behavioral genetics Statistical genetics Psychiatric genetics
- Institutions: University of Texas at Austin
- Thesis: Global and Domain-Specific Longitudinal Cognitive Changes Throughout Adulthood (2009)
- Doctoral advisor: Timothy Salthouse

Elliot Max Tucker-Drob is Professor of Psychology at the University of Texas at Austin, where he is also a Professor of Psychiatry, a faculty research associate at the Population Research Center, a faculty research associate at the Center for Aging and Population Studies, and director of the Lifespan Development Lab. He is the co-founder and co-director of the Texas Twin Project. He is known for his research in the fields of developmental psychology, cognitive aging, behavioral genetics, and statistical genetics. This has included research on the effects of education and socioeconomic status on children's cognitive development and academic achievement; cognitive aging and dementia; the genetic architecture of psychiatric disorders; and the development of Genomic Structural Equation Modelling, a statistical framework for the multivariate analysis of genome-wide association study data.
