= Irwin Waldman =

American psychologist

- Education: Cornell University; University of Waterloo
- Known for: Minnesota Transracial Adoption Study
- Scientific career
- Fields: Behavior genetics
- Institutions: Emory University
- Thesis: Relationships between non-social information processing, social perception, and social status in 7 to 12 year old boys (1988)

Irwin Douglas Waldman is an American psychologist and geneticist who is professor of psychology at Emory University. He is known for his research in behavior genetics, such as the role of genetic factors in population and race differences in intelligence. This has included work on the Minnesota Transracial Adoption Study. He served as president of the Behavior Genetics Association from 2010 to 2011, and is now an associate editor for its official journal, Behavior Genetics.
