= David C. Rowe =

American psychologist

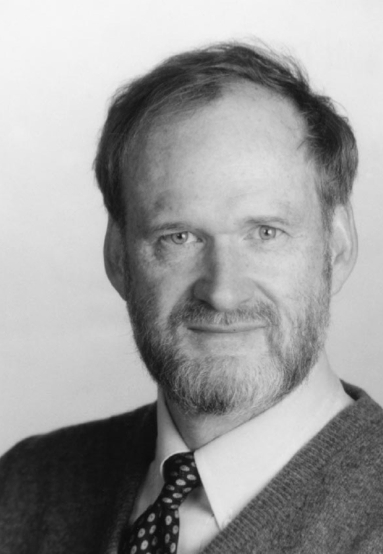
- Rowe in 1999
- Born: September 27, 1949
- Died: February 2, 2003 (aged 53)
- Education: Harvard University (BA); University of Colorado Boulder (PhD)
- Known for: Scarr–Rowe effect
- Scientific career
- Fields: Psychology, behavior genetics
- Workplaces: Oberlin College; University of Oklahoma; University of Arizona
- Thesis: Temperament, School Adjustment and Peers (1977)
- Doctoral advisor: Robert Plomin

David Christian Rowe (September 27, 1949 – February 2, 2003) was an American psychologist known for his work studying genetic and environmental influences on adolescent onset behaviors such as delinquency and smoking. His research into interaction between genetics and environment led to the discovery of the Scarr–Rowe effect.

== Life and career ==
Rowe earned his Bachelor of Arts from Harvard University and his Ph.D. from the University of Colorado Boulder, where he was a student at the Institute for Behavioral Genetics.

Rowe was well known for his work on the genes and the environment: how they interact, what the limits of environment and genes might be, and what mechanisms implement these effects. He also focussed on articulating the different realms of the social environment: shared in families, unique to individuals, neighbourhood or nation level social and cultural effects. His book The Limits of Family Influence: Genes, Experience and Behaviour brought together much of this work.

This work led to several substantive findings on shared and nonshared environmental influences; seminal work on the heritability of parenting behaviors (the genetics of the environment for children); on the heritability of antisocial behavior; race differences and their causes; for testing the interaction of education, and social class with genes in the development of intelligence; and for blending behavioral and molecular genetics. He made several methodological contributions, including work on modeling of means and covariances with raw data, the utility of the DeFries–Fulker analysis, and measured genes and environmental influences. The Add Health data featured in much of his research, and he served as the main geneticist on this large and influential survey of over 90,000 adolescents across the United States.

Rowe's work highlighted the often surprising immunity of mental states to social circumstances, reporting that "great fortune does not guarantee happiness; neither does great misfortune assure depression". This led to his positing of biological set points as a mechanism for stability, as well as arguing for indirect genetic effects: that different genotypes would cause different people to react to the same environment in different ways, and, moreover, that individuals expose themselves to different social environments. This led to ideas about active seeking and environment construction, as well the idea that exposure to (controllable) life events may result partly from genetic predisposition. He was an advocate of Consilience: including biological individuality along with social, psychological, and cultural factors in any understanding of human behavior.

In 1994 he was one of 52 signatories on "Mainstream Science on Intelligence," an editorial written by Linda Gottfredson and published in The Wall Street Journal, which declared the consensus of the signing scholars on issues related to intelligence research following the publication of the book The Bell Curve. Rowe's work identified gene-environment interactions in cognitive traits, and contributed to understanding of the Scarr-Rowe Effect, which posits that the heritability of intelligence is higher in children with higher socioeconomic status. His final paper, published posthumously, advocated for impartial testing of genetic versus environmental influences on racial differences, by which he meant taking seriously the possibility that observed Black-white differences in IQ had a genetic basis, a position he believed had been given short shrift by the scientific community.

== Books ==
- Rowe DC (1995). The Limits of Family Influence: Genes, Experience, and Behavior. The Guilford Press, ISBN 0-89862-148-8
- Rowe DC (2001). Biology and Crime. Roxbury Publishing Company, ISBN 1-891487-80-9
