= Donald W. MacKinnon =

American psychologist (1903–1987)

Donald MacKinnon
- Born: Donald Wallace MacKinnon; January 9, 1903; Augusta, Maine
- Died: January 20, 1987 (aged 84); Stockton, California
- Education: Bowdoin College; Harvard University
- Scientific career
- Fields: Personality psychology
- Workplaces: University of California, Berkeley
- Thesis: The violations of prohibitions in the solving of problems (1933)
- Notable students: John C. Loehlin

Donald Wallace MacKinnon (January 9, 1903 – January 20, 1987) was an American psychologist and professor at the University of California, Berkeley. He was known for researching the psychology of creativity.

== Career ==
After receiving his Ph.D. from Harvard University in 1933, he became a professor at Bryn Mawr College, where he remained until 1947. From 1944 to 1946, he went on leave from Bryn Mawr College to direct the United States Office of Strategic Services's Station S during World War II. He joined the faculty of the University of California, Berkeley in 1947, and became the founding director of the Institute of Personality Assessment and Research there in 1949. He remained the institute's director until 1970, and used the skills he had learned during World War II at the institute. He was the president of the Division of Personality and Social Psychology from 1951 to 1952, and of the Western Psychological Association from 1963 to 1964. He retired from Berkeley in 1970. In 1973, he began a one-year stint as a visiting fellow at the Center for Creative Leadership and an adjunct professor of psychology at the University of North Carolina, Chapel Hill.
