= Richard A. Weinberg =

American psychologist (1943–2025)

- Born: Richard Alan Weinberg; January 28, 1943; Chicago, Illinois, U.S.
- Died: October 3, 2025 (aged 82); Minnetonka, Minnesota, U.S.
- Education: University of Minnesota
- Scientific career
- Fields: Developmental psychology
- Workplaces: University of Minnesota
- Thesis: The effects of different types of reinforcement in training a reflective conceptual tempo (1968)

Richard Alan Weinberg (January 28, 1943 – October 3, 2025) was an American developmental psychologist.

== Life and career ==
Weinberg was born in Chicago, Illinois, on January 28, 1943. He was Jewish. He received his undergraduate education at the University of Wisconsin–Madison. For most of his career, Weinberg taught at the University of Minnesota after earning his Ph.D. there in 1968. He is known for his Minnesota Transracial Adoption Study with Sandra Scarr. This study concluded that "rather than the home environment having a cumulative impact across development, its influence wanes from early childhood to adolescence".

Weinberg served on the board of directors of the American Psychological Association and the American Psychological Society. With Richard M. Lerner and Celia Fisher, he was a founding editor of Applied Developmental Science.

Weinberg died on October 3, 2025, at the age of 82.

== Publications ==
- Boehm AE, Weinberg RA. The Classroom Observer: Developing Observation Skills in Early Childhood Settings. Teachers College Press; 3rd edition (1996). ISBN 0-8077-3570-1
- Lamb ME et al. (eds). Applied Developmental Science: Special Issue : The Effects of Quality Care on Child Development. Lawrence Erlbaum Associates (2000). ISBN 0-8058-9752-6
- Child Psychology in Retrospect and Prospect: In Celebration of the 75th Anniversary of the Institute of Child Development (Minnesota Symposia on Child Psychology). Lawrence Erlbaum Associates (2002). ISBN 0-8058-3971-2
- Zeldin S et al. (eds). Applied Developmental Science: Promoting Adolescent Development in Community Context : Challenges to Scholars, Nonprofit Managers, and Higher Education (Applied Developmental Science). Lawrence Erlbaum Associates (2000). ISBN 0-8058-9750-X
