= 1995 University of Maryland conference on crime and genetics =

Conference held by the University of Maryland about genetics and crime

The University of Maryland hosted a 1995 conference to examine and discuss the relationship between genetics and crime. It took place from September 22 to 24 at the Aspen Institute in Queenstown, Maryland. It was originally planned for 1992, but was effectively cancelled after the original proposal was met with fierce backlash and accusations of racism.

== Background ==
=== Originally planned 1992 conference ===
In 1992, UMD professor David Wasserman set out to organize a meeting to discuss the potential genetic bases for criminal behavior. The originally planned conference was entitled "Genetic Factors in Crime: Findings, Uses and Implications", and was scheduled to be held on the University of Maryland's College Park campus on October 9, 1992. It was to be funded by a $78,000 grant from the National Institutes of Health (NIH).

When the planned conference became known to the public, it faced swift backlash and condemnation from civil rights activists, as well as from Peter Breggin, a prominent critic of psychiatry. Breggin's claim that the conference was racist had attracted the attention of the Congressional Black Caucus, which subsequently joined Breggin in protesting the conference, as did the Association of Black Psychologists and the NAACP's Baltimore chapter. Wasserman responded to the conference's critics by saying that the conference would aim to critically examine, not promote, research linking genes to crime, but this did not satisfy its critics. The backlash to Alcohol, Drug Abuse, and Mental Health Administration then-director Frederick K. Goodwin's controversial statement earlier that year, which compared inner cities in the United States to "jungles", inspired further opposition. Breggin had publicly linked the planned conference both to Goodwin's remarks and to an anti-violence initiative that had recently been proposed by then-Secretary of Health and Human Services Louis Wade Sullivan.

In July 1992, the NIH's National Center for Human Genome Research revoked the $78,000 grant that it had already given in response to the opposition, effectively cancelling it. That September, the NIH announced that it would be postponing the conference indefinitely, putting an end to the organizers' attempts to convince the NIH to reinstate the grant. In defending their decision to revoke the conference grant, it also cited a brochure promoting the conference and claimed that the brochure implied, falsely, that the NIH itself believed that there was a definitive link between genetics and crime. John W. Diggs, the NIH's then-deputy director for outside research, told the New York Times that the brochure suggested as scientific facts the link between genetics and crime and the potential for genetic tests to identify people predisposed to criminal behavior. Diggs further said that these statements "inflamed public opinion" and deviated significantly from the scope of the original grant proposal.

The University of Maryland responded to the cancellation by claiming that the NIH's withdrawal of the grant was a violation of the university's academic freedom and appealed the NIH's decision to cancel the conference. The appeal succeeded, and NIH funded the conference again, this time with a $133,000 grant. The NIH's new grant was awarded after Wasserman broadened the scope of topics to be covered in the conference, as well as allowing for more discussion on the desirability and potential implications of the research. This broader scope was reflected in the conference's new name, "The Meaning and Significance of Research on Genetics and Criminal Behavior", and also persuaded some critics of the original 1992 conference to attend the new one. After the change in scope, the conference ended up focusing "...far more on the significance of the research into the biology of violent behavior than it did on the research itself", as Natalie Angier noted. Despite the changed scope, however, Goodwin criticized the 1995 conference for being designed to attract controversy, rather than to address the topic from a scientific perspective.

== Conference ==
The conference took place from Friday, September 22 to Sunday, September 24, 1995, at the Aspen Institute, a liberal think tank in Queenstown, Maryland. In total, about 70 "biologists, criminologists, historians, and philosophers" attended the conference, according to Science. Panelists included Diana Fishbein, Dorothy Nelkin, Evan Balaban, David Comings, Irving Gottesman, Adrian Raine, and Adrienne Asch.

On September 23, 1995, the second day of the conference, over 30 protesters with signs and red flags marched into the meeting. The protesters, who were affiliated with the Progressive Labor Party, accused the conference's organizers of "pushing genocide". They went on to invade one of the conference rooms at the institute, where they grabbed a microphone and denounced the meeting. The protest was ended peacefully two hours later. Some of the protesters also compared the topics discussed at the conference to eugenics, a sentiment echoed by panelist Paul Billings. In the opening discussion, Billings asked, "How do we know the bad old days are over? I would argue that the evidence is that the bad old days aren't over."

On September 24, the third and last day of the conference, Howard University professor Rodney Green began addressing the audience just as they were leaving for a coffee break. Green told them, "We have to consider whether this conference should continue. What we heard this morning...was a racist presentation under the guise of genetics."

After the conference ended, a report based on the talks given there was published in Politics and the Life Sciences. Some of the conference talks were also published in the 2001 book Genes and Criminal Behavior, published as part of Cambridge University Press's Cambridge Studies in Philosophy and Public Policy series.
