= Ute Schmid =

German computer scientist

Ute Maria Schmid
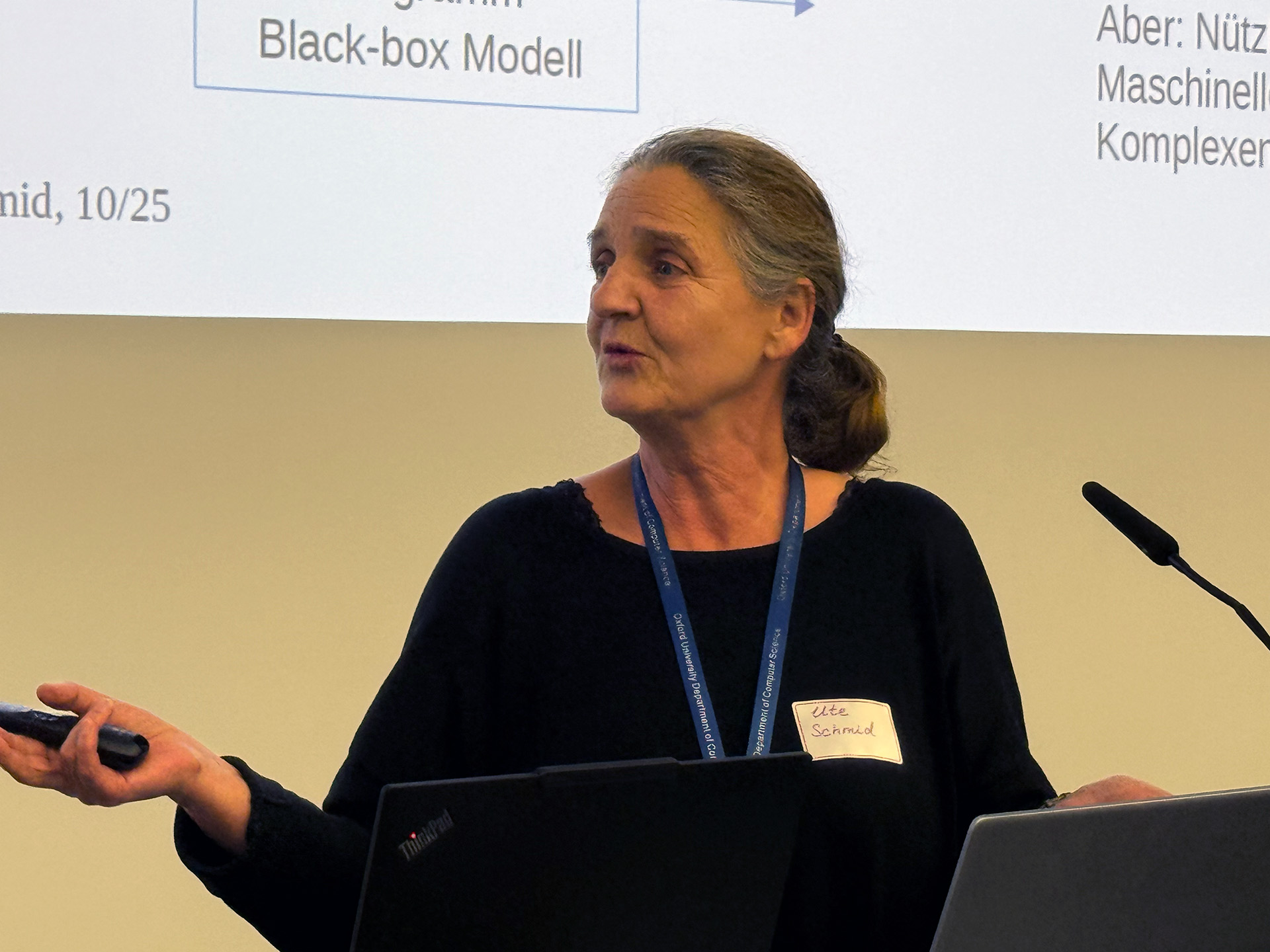
- Education: Technische Universität Berlin; University of Koblenz and Landau
- Known for: interpretable artificial intelligence inductive programming
- Scientific career
- Workplaces: University of Bamberg; Osnabrück University; Carnegie Mellon University
- Thesis: Erwerb rekursiver Programmiertechniken als Induktion von Konzepten und Regeln: Ein kognitionswissenschaftlicher Zugang zum Erwerb kognitiver Fertigkeiten (1994)
- Doctoral advisor: Bernd Mahr; Klaus Eyferth

Ute Maria Schmid (born 1965) is a German computer scientist whose research interests include interpretable artificial intelligence and inductive programming. She is a professor at the University of Bamberg, in charge of the chair for cognitive systems.

== Education and career ==
Schmid was a high school student at St.-Thomas-Gymnasium Wettenhausen. She studied psychology at the Erziehungswissenschaftlichen Hochschule Landau (which became part of the University of Koblenz and Landau and later the University of Kaiserslautern-Landau) and at Technische Universität Berlin, earning a diploma through TU Berlin in 1989. Following this, she continued at TU Berlin, studying computer science. She earned both a second diploma and a doctorate (Dr. rer. nat.) in 1994, with a dissertation jointly supervised by computer scientist Bernd Mahr and psychologist Klaus Eyferth. She completed a habilitation through TU Berlin in 2002.

After postdoctoral research at Carnegie Mellon University, Schmid worked as an assistant professor at TU Berlin from 1994 until 2001, and as a lecturer at Osnabrück University from 2001 to 2004. She took her present position as a professor at the University of Bamberg in 2004, and served as dean of the Faculty of Information Systems and Applied Computer Sciences from 2017 to 2019.

== Recognition ==
Schmid is a Fellow of the European Association for Artificial Intelligence, elected in 2022. In 2023, she was named as a Fellow of the German Informatics Society, honoring her interdisciplinary research combining psychology and computer science, her work in primary school computer science education, and her position as a role model for young women in computer science. In 2026, Schmid received the Communicator Award from the German Research Foundation and the Stifterverband for her science communication work in the field of artificial intelligence.
