= Gontia (deity) =

Celtic goddess

Gontia (/ˈɡɒntiə/) was a Celtic goddess. She was the tutelary deity of the river Günz, near Günzburg in Germany. She is known from an inscription on a Roman-era altar at Günzburg (Latin: Guntia) that reads Gontiae / sac(rum) / G(aius!) Iulius / Faventianus / (centurio) leg(ionis) I Ital(icae), 'Gaius Julius Faventianus, centurion of the Legio I Italica, (made) this offering to Gontia'.
