= Eyferth study =

Racial study done by Klaus Eyferth in West Germany

The Eyferth study, conducted by German psychologist Klaus Eyferth, examined the IQs of white and racially-mixed children raised by single mothers in post-World War II West Germany. The mothers of the children studied were white German women, while their fathers were white and black members of the US occupation forces. The study found that average IQs of the children studied were roughly similar across racial groups, making the study an oft-cited piece of evidence in the debate about race and intelligence.

Eyferth's study was first published under the title Eine Untersuchung der Neger-Mischlingskinder in Westdeutschland in the journal Vita Humana in 1959. Eyferth described further results in the paper Leistungen verschiedener Gruppen von Besatzungskindern in Hamburg-Wechsler Intelligenztest für Kinder (HAWIK), which was published in the journal Archiv für die gesamte Psychologie in 1961.

== Study design ==
The children studied had been raised by their unmarried German mothers. Most of the fathers, white or black, had been members of the US occupation forces stationed in Germany. At the time of the study, the children were aged between 5 and 13 (mean age: 10). The mothers of the children were approximately matched for socio-economic status; they were mostly of low socioeconomic status. There were about 98 mixed race (black-white), and about 83 white children in the sample. The total sample consisted of about 5 percent of the German children known to have been fathered by black soldiers between 1945 and 1953, in addition to a matched sample of 83 German children whose fathers were white soldiers. Of the fathers of the mixed-race children, about 20 percent were French Africans and the remaining approximately 80 percent were African Americans.

For assessing IQ, a German version of the WISC intelligence test (Hamburg Wechsler Intelligence Scale for Children, HAWIK) was used.

== Results ==
The white children studied averaged an IQ of 97.2, whereas the average of the racially mixed children was 96.5.

Sorted out by sex and race, the average scores obtained were:

Group	Boys	Girls	Difference
White	101	93	8
Mixed race	97	96	1
Difference	-4	3	

== Interpretations ==
Stressing the similarity of average IQ scores across racial groups in the Eyferth study, scholars such as James Flynn, Richard E. Nisbett, Nathan Brody have interpreted it as supporting the notion that IQ differences between whites and blacks observed in many other studies are mostly or wholly cultural or environmental in origin. Moreover, they have pointed out that mixed-race children may have faced prejudice growing up as a racial minority, making the similarity of results even more significant.

== See also ==
- History of the race and intelligence controversy
- Minnesota Transracial Adoption Study
