= John C. Loehlin =

American behavior geneticist, computer scientist, and psychologist (1926–2020)

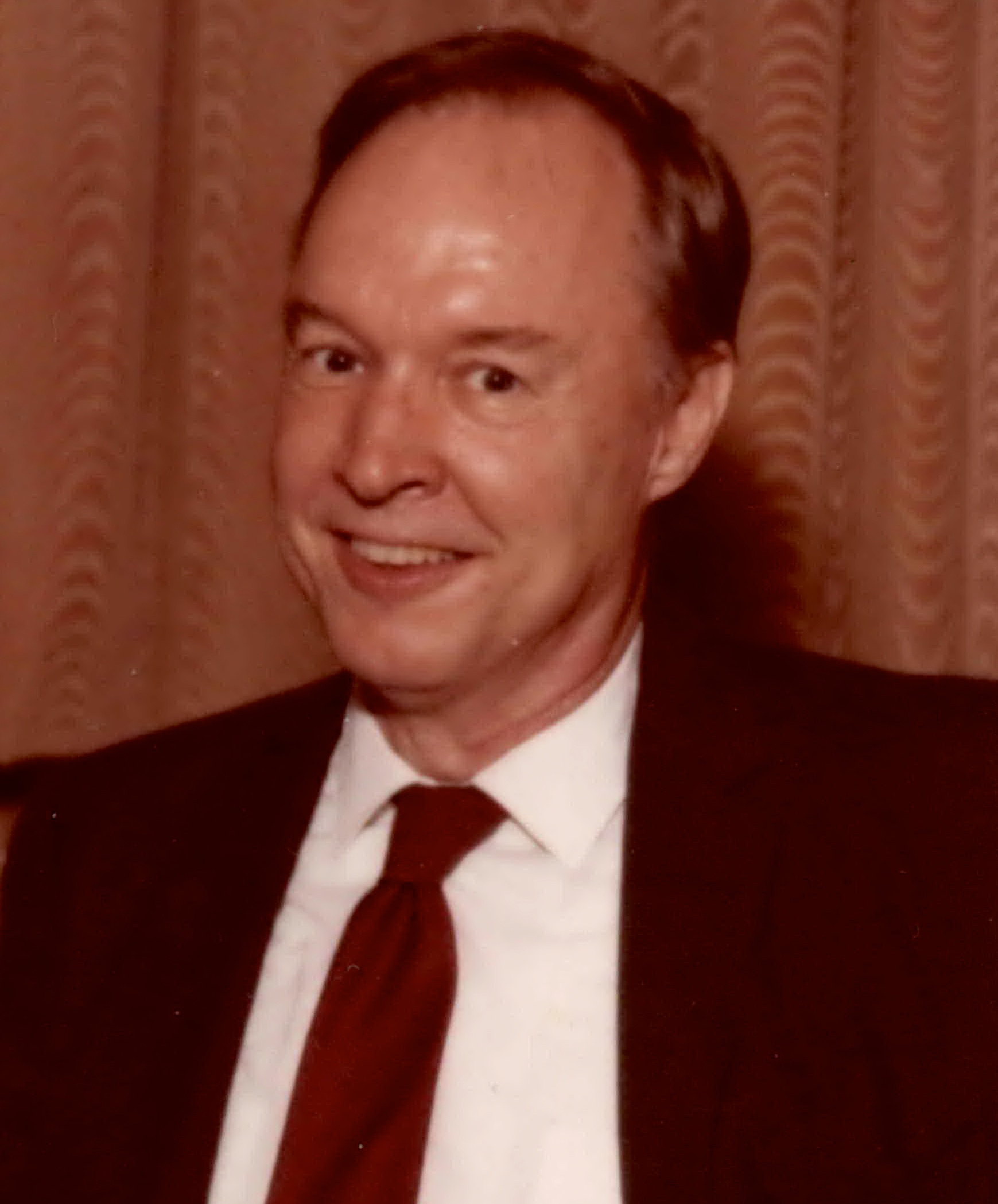
- Born: John Clinton Loehlin; January 13, 1926; India
- Died: August 9, 2020 (aged 94); Austin, Texas, U.S.
- Education: Harvard University (BA); University of California, Berkeley (PhD)
- Known for: Research on intelligence, personality, structural equation modeling, race and intelligence controversy, behavior genetics
- Scientific career
- Fields: Psychology
- Workplaces: University of Texas; University of Nebraska
- Thesis: The influence of different activities on the apparent length of time (1957)
- Doctoral advisors: Donald Wallace MacKinnon, Richard Crutchfield

John Clinton Loehlin (January 13, 1926 – August 9, 2020) was an American behaviorial geneticist, computer scientist, and psychologist. Loehlin served as president of the Behavior Genetics Association and of the Society of Multivariate Experimental Psychology. He was an ISIR lifetime achievement awardee.

== Life and career ==
He received a Bachelor of Arts in English from Harvard University in 1947, and a Ph.D. in psychology from the University of California, Berkeley, in 1957. He was on active service in the United States Naval Reserve in 1951-53 during the Korean War. He taught at the University of Nebraska from 1957 to 1964, then took a position at the University of Texas at Austin, where he remained the rest of his life.

Even after retirement, he remained active in research and publishing. His book on Latent variable models (now in its fourth edition) remains very popular. He was a keen poet. His son is the American author and scholar James Loehlin.

Loehlin's research chiefly focused on the genetic and environmental contributions to individual differences in normal human personality traits and abilities; he was also concerned with racial differences and with computer modeling. He was involved in several twin family, and adoption studies, notably the Texas Adoption Project with Joseph M. Horn and Lee Willerman.

He wrote on the race and intelligence controversy. He was a Director of the American Eugenics Society from 1968 to 1974. In 1994 he was one of 52 signatories on "Mainstream Science on Intelligence", a public statement written by Linda Gottfredson, published in response to popular criticism of the conclusions presented in Richard J. Herrnstein and Charles Murray's controversial book The Bell Curve (1994). One of his PhD students was Eric Turkheimer.

In 1995, he took part in the American Psychological Association task force writing a consensus statement on the state of intelligence research in response to the claims being advanced amid the Bell Curve controversy, titled "Intelligence: Knowns and Unknowns."

== Selected publications ==
- Loehlin, J. C. (1968). Computer models of personality. New York: Random House.
- Loehlin, J. C., Lindzey, G., & Spuhler, J. N. (1975). Race differences in intelligence. San Francisco: Freeman.
- Loehlin, J. C., & Nichols, R. C. (1976). Heredity, environment, and personality: A study of 850 sets of twins. Austin, TX: University of Texas Press.
- Loehlin, J. C. (1987). Latent variable models: An introduction to factor, path, and structural analysis. Hillsdale, NJ: Erlbaum.
- Loehlin, J. C. (1992). Genes and environment in personality development. Newbury Park, CA: Sage.
- Loehlin, J.C. (2004). Latent Variable Models: An Introduction to Factor, Path, and Structural Equation Analysis. Psychology Press.
