= Tina Stöckle =

German author (1948–1992)

- Born: Tina Stöckle; 12 September 1948; Günzburg, Bavaria, Allied-occupied Germany
- Died: 8 April 1992 (aged 43); Günzburg, Bavaria, Germany
- Occupations: Author and activist of humanistic anti-psychiatry
- Years active: 1983–1992

Tina Stöckle (born September 12, 1948 in Günzburg in Upper Swabia, † April 8, 1992 in Günzburg) was a German author and activist of humanistic antipsychiatry.

== Biography ==
Tina Stöckle was a secondary school teacher and completed a second degree in Diplom-Education at the TU Berlin. After she was repeatedly housed in psychiatry, she came in the fall of 1980 on the madding offensive in Berlin and made in 1983 a significant part in the development of (financed with state funds) meeting point of the lunatic as well as on his operation. From 1982 she was committed to the idea of Weglaufhauses. She has been instrumental in advancing patriarchal and academic antipsychiatry towards a more user-driven, humanistic and feminist position in antipsychiatry. In 1989 she was a founding member of the Association for the Protection against Psychiatric Violence e.V. In her honor, the Weglaufhaus in Berlin is nicknamed "Villa Stöckle".

== Death ==
Died on April 8, 1992. In her honor, the Weglaufhaus in Berlin bears the epithet «Villa Stöckle». Book release: «The insane offensive. Experiences of a Self-Help Organization of Psychiatric Survivors », Berlin Peter Lehmann Antipsychiatrieverlag 2005.

== Books ==
Stöckle, Tina (1948). Die Irren-Offensive : Erfahrungen einer Selbsthilfe-Organisation von Psychiatrieopfern / Tina Stöckle. Germany: Frankfurt : Extrabuch, [1983. 2005.] p. 290 p. ISBN 9783887042035.
