= The Genetic Lottery =

2021 book by Kathryn Paige Harden

The Genetic Lottery: Why DNA Matters for Social Equality
- First edition
- Author: Kathryn Paige Harden
- Genre: Nonfiction
- Publisher: Princeton University Press
- Publication date: September 21, 2021
- Pages: 312
- ISBN: 9780691190808

The Genetic Lottery: Why DNA Matters for Social Equality is a book by the American psychologist and behavior geneticist Kathryn Paige Harden, a professor of psychology at the University of Texas at Austin. Published in September 2021 by Princeton University Press, it argues that human genetic variation needs to be acknowledged in order to create a fair and equal society. Harden encourages people to conceptualize genetic predispositions to greater socioeconomic status and educational attainment as "genetic luck" rather than "superiority" or individual worth. The book also aims to counter pseudoscientific ideas such as race science and eugenics, which have been used to explain and justify social inequalities.

Some reviewers said the book describes behavior genetics accurately and accessibly, while others rejected Harden's message that accommodating genetic inequality would be a valuable way to advance egalitarianism.

== Background ==
Harden was motivated to write The Genetic Lottery to try to change people's minds about what she considers the need for social scientists to consider genetics in their research, and to assuage fears about the negative societal consequences of doing so. She told Gideon Lewis-Kraus that the book was "fundamentally defensive in a lot of ways" in cautioning against over-interpretation of genetic data, such as the results of genome-wide association studies.

== Reviews ==
Jonathan Flint reviewed The Genetic Lottery favorably, concluding, "Harden’s book provides its readers with an accessible introduction to the current state of behavioral genetics...Her well-argued text is an excellent example of how to make difficult genetic concepts clear".

University of Cambridge geneticist Aylwyn Scally also reviewed the book favorably, writing in Nature Ecology & Evolution that it "provides a better basis for debate about these issues and the role of genetics in society than previous contributions in the same sphere, and a corrective to the more notorious of them, which in itself makes it valuable and welcome."

Economist Jason Fletcher published a mixed review of The Genetic Lottery in the journal Population and Development Review. He stated that "The book's main messages will appeal to a variety of researchers, many of whom are uninitiated into behavioral genetics." However, he also criticized the book for what he refers to as "an aggressive, persistent bait and switch" because, in the book, Harden almost never discusses sibling studies despite extensively describing genetic differences between biological siblings as a "lottery".

In another mixed review, Portland State University philosopher Bryan Cwik stated, "The book is a masterly tour of the state of the art of behavioral genetics and its relevance for pressing social questions, but despite the ambition and daring nature of its central claim, its effort to make the case for an “anti-eugenic” science and policy is ultimately disappointing."

A negative review of the book in Los Angeles Review of Books written by four academics stated: "While we admire Harden’s social justice aims, we remain unconvinced by her biological explanation for socioeconomic inequality. In making her case to liberals, we believe Harden extrapolates beyond what current scientific results allow. She has expanded an interesting but narrow finding — that DNA influences educational attainment and other social outcomes for individuals of European ancestry in high-income countries — into a unified theory of society and a basis for sweeping social reform."

Another negative review written by Nathaniel Comfort for American Scientist stated, "For a book on applied human genetics published in 2021, The Genetic Lottery is astonishingly blinkered when it comes to race and disability. These things should be de rigueur for a book on progressive social policy." "Understanding natural differences in ability as luck, Harden argues, allows us to reject the idea that ability equals social or moral worth. We avoid eugenics by thinking of difference not as “innate superiority,” but rather as simply a better roll of the genetic dice. However, the two are not mutually exclusive. Harden’s “genetic luck” and good old-fashioned breeding are coextensive.", "All of Harden’s insights or recommendations can be reached without recourse to genetics.", "Harden offers no concrete suggestions for how taking genetics into account would benefit the disadvantaged—and not a word on how to keep it from harming them.", "Harden doesn’t address the hard stuff, such as general literacy, school funding, remedial education, charter schools, and curricular reform." that "Ultimately, the book is more a defense of behavior genetics than an introduction to a truly useful tool for education policy." He concluded: "Hereditarianism [the belief that nature is more important than nurture] has increased inequality in every era of genetics. Harden offers no reason to believe that the genome age will be any different."

Joseph L. Graves reviewed the book in the Lancet, concluding that "Despite Harden’s talent and best intentions, in my view this book does not make a convincing case for how to advance progressive social movements" and arguing that changing the social environment of individuals will be more beneficial to creating social equality than any of the genetically based policy proposals Harden outlines in the book.

In a review published in Evolution, the review authors Graham Coop and Molly Przeworski stated that the book "...leaves us unconvinced, and with the impression of genomics serving as a distraction from much more exigent political conversations." This sparked a response from Kathryn Paige Harden and a counter-response from the authors, arguing that the book "misinterprets findings from genome-wide association studies (GWAS) of educational attainment and overstates their relevance for our understanding of social inequalities".

The April 21, 2022 issue of the New York Review of Books published a negative review of The Genetic Lottery entitled "Why Biology Is Not Destiny". Written by Marcus Feldman and Jessica Riskin, the review claimed that Harden "disguises her radically subjective view of biological essentialism as an objective fact" and compared her writing to the parable of the "boiling frog" in the way that Harden gradually proceeds from less controversial premises to more controversial conclusions. In a 2021 review essay focused on the book, Daphne Martschenko argued that, contrary to the book's contentions, "embracing a political agenda in which genetics matter for social equality will not in practice advance efforts to reduce social inequality."
