= Eric Turkheimer =

American psychologist

Eric Nathan Turkheimer
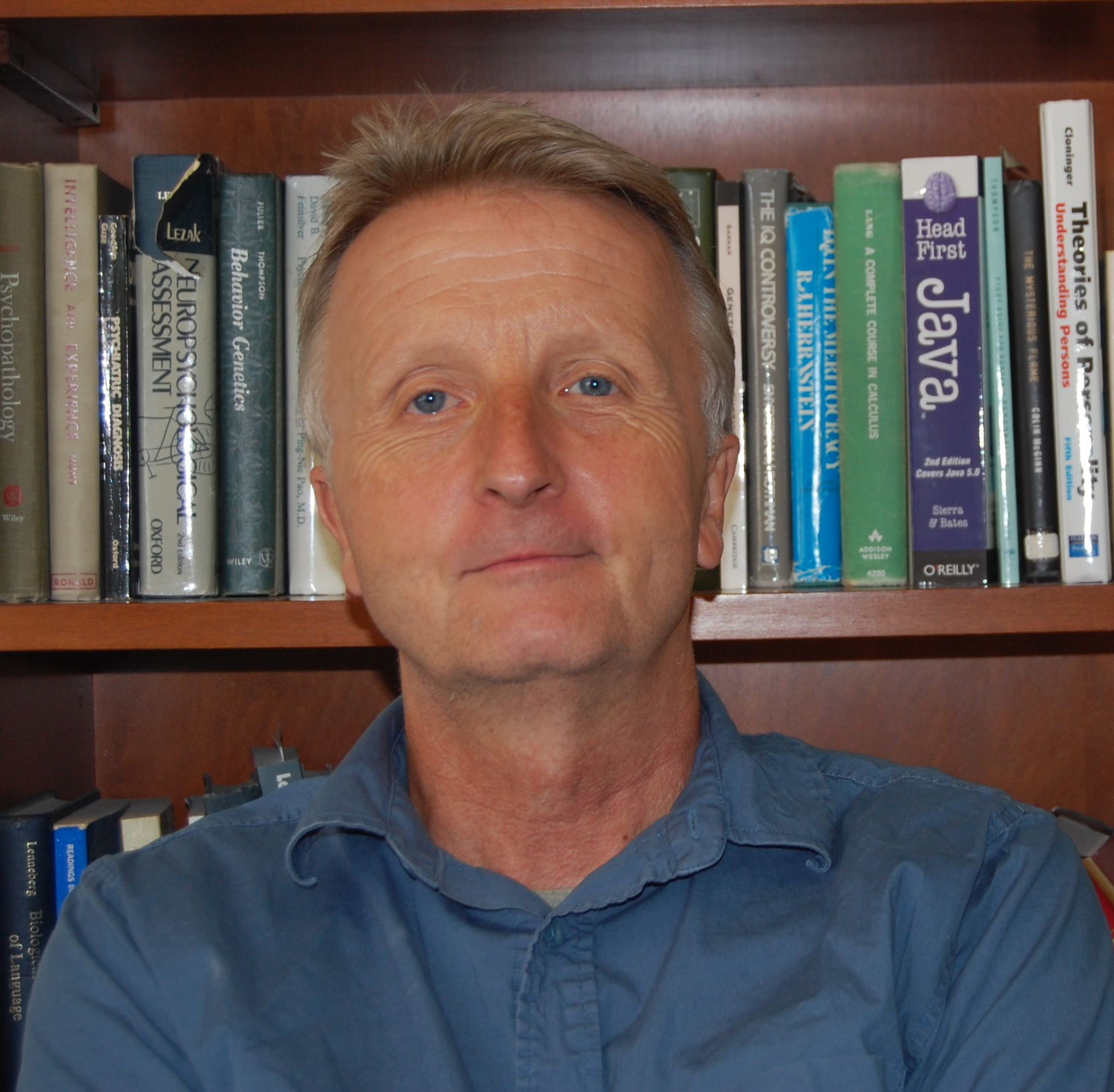
- Turkheimer in 2010
- Occupation: Professor of psychology
- Known for: Behavior genetics, Gene-environment interactions
- Title: Hugh Scott Hamilton Professor of psychology
- Spouse: Carol Manning

Academic background
- Education: Haverford College; University of Texas at Austin
- Thesis: Cognitive development of adopted and fostered children (1986)
- Doctoral advisor: John Loehlin
- Influences: Irving Gottesman

Academic work
- Discipline: Psychology, Behavior Genetics
- Sub-discipline: GxSES
- Institutions: University of Virginia
- Notable students: Paige Harden

Eric Nathan Turkheimer is an American psychologist and the Hugh Scott Hamilton Professor of psychology at the University of Virginia.

== Early life and education ==
Turkheimer is the son of Nathan Turkheimer, the former board chairman of the public relations law firm Turkheimer & Ryan, Inc., and his wife, Barbara Tack Turkheimer. He grew up in Croton-on-Hudson, New York, where he graduated from Croton Harmon High School in 1971. He is Jewish. He received his B.A. in psychology from Haverford College in 1976. He earned his Ph.D. in clinical psychology from the University of Texas at Austin (UT-Austin) in 1986, where he studied under Lee Willerman and John Loehlin.

== Career ==
In 1986, Turkheimer joined the faculty of the University of Virginia, where he became an associate professor in 1992 and a full professor in 2001. He was Director of Clinical Training there from 2003 to 2008. In April 2021, he was elected to the American Academy of Arts and Sciences.

== Research ==
Turkheimer is known for studying the effects of socioeconomic status and genes on IQ, especially in regards to gene-environment interactions. For example, in a 2003 study, he and his colleagues found that the environment accounted for about 60% of the variance in IQ among low-income children, while genes accounted for almost none of it. In contrast, this study also found that the reverse was true for wealthy children. Later studies have shown the effect size of the interaction varies between countries. Since then, along with his University of Virginia colleague David Fask, he has published other studies that also suggest that IQ is more heritable among wealthy families than among poor ones. In a 2011 commentary about environmental influences on human behavior, he wrote that “The nonshared environment, in a phrase, is free will. Not the kind of metaphysical free will that no one believes in anymore, according to which human souls float free above the mechanistic constraints of the physical world, but an embodied free will, tethered to biology, that encompasses our ability to respond to complex circumstances in complex and unpredictable ways and in the process to build a self.”

== Media and politics ==
Turkheimer has been featured on multiple YouTube talk shows, including Stefan Molyneux, The Majority Report with Sam Seder, and The David Pakman Show. In 2017, Turkheimer along with Richard Nisbett and Paige Harden, published a piece in Vox criticizing Charles Murray and Sam Harris' views on race and intelligence, following an appearance of Murray on Harris' show.

Politically, Turkheimer identifies as left-wing. He supports what he calls "the radical scientific left", (e.g. Peter Schönemann), despite disagreeing with them on a few issues.
