= Klaus Eyferth =

German psychologist (1928–2012)

- Born: 9 November 1928
- Died: 19 July 2012 (aged 83)
- Education: University of Hamburg
- Known for: Eyferth study
- Scientific career
- Fields: Psychology
- Workplaces: Technische Universität Berlin
- Thesis: Die Entstehung des Selbstbildes in der sozialen Interaktion (1957)

Klaus Eyferth (9 November 1928 – 19 July 2012) was a German psychologist. He was educated at the University of Hamburg, from which he received his diploma in 1954, his doctorate in 1957, and his habilitation in 1964. While at the University of Hamburg, he conducted a study on the IQ scores of the German-raised children of black and white American soldiers stationed in Allied-occupied Germany. This study has since become known as the Eyferth study. In 1973, he joined the faculty of Technische Universität Berlin, where he went on to help establish the Institute for Psychology. A member of the German Psychological Society, he hosted its 1988 conference in Berlin. In 1995, he retired from TU Berlin; he became an emeritus professor there the following year. He died on 19 July 2012, at the age of 83.
