= Irving Gottesman =

Psychiatric geneticist

- Gottesman with his books
- Born: Irving Isadore Gottesman; December 29, 1930; Cleveland, Ohio, United States
- Died: June 29, 2016 (aged 85); Edina, Minnesota, United States
- Education: University of Minnesota; Illinois Institute of Technology
- Known for: Genetic studies of schizophrenia
- Awards: Hofheimer Prize for Research (1973); Dobzhansky Award (1990); William James Book Award (1991); Joseph Zubin Award (2001, 2014); APA Distinguished Scientific Contributions (2001); Gold Medal Award for Life Achievement in the Science of Psychology (2007); Grawemeyer Award (2013)
- Scientific career
- Fields: Behavior genetics, Psychiatric genetics
- Institutions: Harvard University; Maudsley–Bethlem hospitals; University of Minnesota; Washington University School of Medicine; University of Virginia
- Doctoral advisor: Robert D. Wirt

Irving Isadore Gottesman (December 29, 1930 – June 29, 2016) was an American professor of psychology who devoted most of his career to the study of the genetics of schizophrenia. He wrote 17 books and more than 290 other publications, mostly on schizophrenia and behavioral genetics, and created the first academic program on behavioral genetics in the United States. He won awards such as the Hofheimer Prize for Research, the highest award from the American Psychiatric Association for psychiatric research. Lastly, Gottesman was a professor in the psychology department at the University of Minnesota, where he received his Ph.D.

A native of Ohio, Gottesman studied psychology for his undergraduate and graduate degrees, became a faculty member at various universities, and spent most of his career at the University of Virginia and the University of Minnesota. He is known for researching schizophrenia in identical twins to document the contributions of genetics and the family, social, cultural, and economic environment to the onset, progress, and inter-generational transmission of the disorder. Gottesman has worked with researchers to analyze hospital records and conduct follow-up interviews of twins where one or both were schizophrenic. He has also researched the effects of genetics and the environment on human violence and variations in human intelligence. Gottesman and co-researcher James Shields introduced the word epigenetics—the control of genes by biochemical signals modified by the environment from other parts of the genome—to the field of psychiatric genetics.

Gottesman has written and co-written a series of books which summarize his work. These publications include raw data from various studies, their statistical interpretation, and possible conclusions presented with necessary background material. The books also include first-hand accounts of schizophrenic patients and relatives tending to them, giving an insight into jumbled thoughts, the disorder's primary symptom. Gottesman and Shields have built models to explain the cause, transmission, and progression of the disorder, which is controlled by many genes acting in concert with the environment, with no cause sufficient by itself.

== Background ==
Past positions
- Gottesman has held the following positions: Sherell J Aston Professor Emeritus of Psychology, University of Virginia; Bernstein Professor of adult psychiatry and senior fellow of department of psychology, medical school, University of Minnesota; Consultant, mental illness & genetics, Office of Technology, 1993–1994; Consultant, National Plan for Schizophrenia, 1988–1989; Institute of med. comt. consultant, Vietnam War Experience Study, 1987–1988; Fellow, Center for Advanced Studies in Behavioral Sciences, Stanford, CA, 1987–1988; Commonwealth professor, University of Virginia, 1985–; Faculty, department of psychiatry, Washington University in St. Louis, 1980–1985; Consultant, National Institute of Mental Health, Washington, 1975–1979, 1992–; Guggenheim fellow, University of Copenhagen, 1972; Training consultant Veterans Administration, Washington, 1968–1985; Professor, department of psychology, University of Minnesota, 1966–1980; Associate professor of psychiatric genetics, department of psychiatry, UNC School of Medicine, 1964–1966; Fellow of psychiatric genetics, Institute of Psychiatry, London, 1963–1964; Lecturer, Department of Social Relations, Harvard University, 1960–1963; and; Intern, clinical psychology, Veterans Administration Hospital, Minneapolis, 1959–1960.

Gottesman was born in Cleveland, Ohio, in 1930, to Bernard and Virginia Gottesman (née Weitzner), who were Hungarian–Romanian Jewish immigrants. He was educated at Miles Standish Elementary and a public school in Cleveland's Shaker Heights. After leaving school, Gottesman joined the United States Navy, where he was given a scholarship and the rank of midshipman, and was assigned to the Naval Reserve Officers Training Corps at the Illinois Institute of Technology in Chicago. He first specialized in physics but changed to psychology, receiving his B.S. degree in 1953.

Gottesman did his graduate work at the University of Minnesota, which then patterned its clinical psychology program on the Boulder model, which emphasized research theory and clinical practice. He joined the graduate program in 1956 after three years with the Navy, supported by the Korean War G.I. Bill. He began investigating personality traits in identical and fraternal twins who had filled out the Minnesota Multiphasic Personality Inventory (MMPI). His Ph.D. thesis, submitted to Psychological Monographs, was rejected before a review on the grounds that the nature–nurture issue it addressed had already been settled in favor of nurture. On appeal, the thesis was reviewed and accepted for publication.

Gottesman began his career at Harvard University as a social relations and psychology lecturer. This non-tenure-track position ended after three years. Then he worked with researcher James Shields at the Maudsley–Bethlem hospital complex in London, using its twin registry to analyze traits of identical and fraternal twins at the lab of Eliot Slater, whom Gottesman met in Rome at the Second International Congress on Human Genetics in 1961. After his return to the University of Minnesota in 1966, Gottesman created a program on behavioral genetics, the first in the U.S. In 1972–1973 he received a Guggenheim fellowship to work with K.O. Christiansen in Denmark. In 1980 he left to join the Washington University School of Medicine, then moved to the University of Virginia in 1985, where he started the clinical psychology training program. Gottesman continued visiting London and collaborating with Shields, with whom he co-wrote a series of books.After spending 16 years at the University of Virginia, Gottesman retired from an active role after 41 years of research, but continued research part-time in psychology and psychiatry.

From 2011 till his death, Gottesman was a professor with an endowed chair in adult psychiatry and a senior fellow in psychology at the University of Minnesota; a fellow of the American Association for the Advancement of Science, the Academy of Clinical Psychology, and the Center for Advanced Study in the Behavioral Sciences at Stanford University; a Guggenheim Fellow for 1972–1973 at the University of Copenhagen; an emeritus in psychology with a chair endowment at the University of Virginia; and an honorary fellow at the London Royal College of Psychiatrists. He has advised 35 graduate students, and an annual lecture on behavior and neurogenetics has been established in his name by the University of Virginia. Gottesman was married to Carol Applen, whom he wed on December 23, 1970; they had two sons. Gottesman died June 29, 2016.

== Scientific contributions ==
=== Studies on schizophrenia and psychopathology ===
Gottesman first studied the genetics of schizophrenia on a large scale using the Maudsley–Bethlem register of twin admissions for 16 years. Later he worked on psychiatric genetics and genomics. In his Twin Cities MMPI study, part of his Ph.D. thesis, Gottesman found high levels of inheritance in the scales related to schizophrenia, depression, anti-social personality disorder, and social introversion. Genes strongly influenced social introversion and aggressive tendencies. This led to further studies on personality traits of identical twins such as the Minnesota Study of Identical Twins Reared Apart.

Analyzing the results of the Maudsley–Bethlem study, Gottesman and Shields devised the multi-element, polygenic causation model for schizophrenia by modeling schizophrenia diagnoses using the recently introduced liability-threshold model. The book that summarized and expanded on the study, Schizophrenia and Genetics: A Twin Study Vantage Point, argued that schizophrenia is a product of several genes acting together, and introduced the techniques of precise analysis in the field of behavioral genetics.Gottesman and Shields introduced terms such as "reaction ranges/surface", "endophenotype" and "epigenetic puzzle" into the behavioral sciences. The threshold model hypothesized that both genetic and environmental risks combined to produce schizophrenia, and pushed an individual into a diagnosable condition when their influence grew strong enough. The reaction range concept is the idea that the genes and the environment control behavior, but with separate upper and lower limits on the strength of that control in each case, a concept now part of basic psychology. Before the study, the prevailing opinion was that schizophrenia originated from bad parental relationships. The researchers showed identical twins were more likely to either have or not have schizophrenia together, concluding the disorder was the "outcome of a genetically determined developmental predisposition".

The Maudsley–Bethlem study also hypothesized that schizophrenia was caused by a mixture of many small traits working together. These endophenotypes could be used for diagnosis. Endophenotypes have been interpreted as a link between genes and the final behavior, acted on by the environment and chance elements, with biochemical and epigenetic influences changing the genome but not being passed on to children. Molecular-biological studies in genetics have referred to endophenotypes to explain genetic causes of psychopathology. The researchers also examined how schizoids, those with mild, schizophrenia-like personality disorders, were linked to schizophrenics. Gottesman and Shields extended the term to classes of mild psychological disorders in twins and relatives of schizophrenics. The researchers had hypothesized that schizoida in a twin was how a schizophrenia carrier gene, one in a non-schizophrenic still passing on a genetic risk, expressed itself. The twin study did not confirm this.

In the Denmark study, the researchers evaluated the extent to which genes underpin psychopathology. Their twin studies of criminality found that a genetic disposition to poor self-control caused both identical twins to become felons, or to not become felons. They also studied identical twins who were discordant for schizophrenia, where one twin was schizophrenic and the other not, and found children of such twins had equal genetic vulnerability to the disease. A later study in the mid-1980s, resulting in a paper awarded the Kurt Schneider Prize, concluded that children of identical twins were at higher risk than those of fraternal twins, indicating the non-schizophrenic identical twin passed on a latent genetic disposition, even if it had not been expressed through schizoida. The Denmark study introduced the concepts of "unexpressed genotypes"—the latent genetic risk, and "epigenetic control"—the biochemical regulation of how genes work, into the new field of behavioral genetics.

=== Studies on delinquency and violence ===
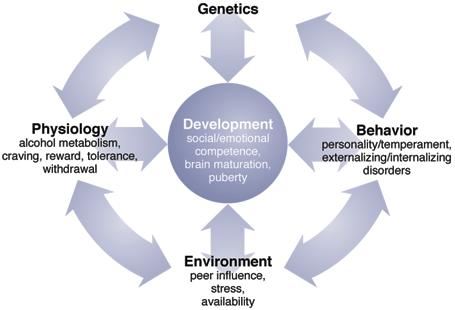
Gottesman's multifactorial model applied to alcoholism

In a 1989 review of the research on juvenile delinquency and violence, Lisabeth DiLalla and Gottesman found delinquency could be transitory or continuous, and genes contributed more to the continuous type. In 1991 the same authors published a critique of the then-prevalent idea of antisocial behavior being transmitted through generations by child abuse alone in antisocial families. They stated that a review by Cathy Spatz Widom and the studies she cited had missed an element: children maltreated in families might have been targets because their genes might have influenced them into committing antisocial acts and attracting such treatment from parents.

Gottesman was one of the presenters at the 1995 conference at the Aspen Institute in Maryland on how strongly genes controlled a person's leaning toward violence and crime. Gottesman presented results from studies on the influence of genes in criminality, stating that identical twins separated at birth were likely to show similar levels of criminal behavior. This concordance indicated that genes influenced such behavior. He did point out that behavioral patterns were strongly influenced by the environment and not set by genes alone. The conference, funded by the National Institutes of Health, was contentious, with detractors arguing that such studies would lead to minority groups, more likely to be criminals because they had lower social status or were poor, being targeted with gene therapy for violence. Protesters disrupted the conference and swarmed into the auditorium. Gottesman reasserted his belief that scientists should proceed with the research, not waiting for humanity to become ethical enough not to misuse it.

=== Work on IQ ===
In 1972, Gottesman was called before the United States Senate by senator Walter Mondale to discuss the then 15-point IQ gap separating African Americans and white Americans. Gottesman testified that genes influenced IQ, but only in conjunction with elements such as schooling, money, and nutritious food from childhood onwards. According to Eric Turkheimer, Gottesman "was certainly the most prominent behavior geneticist to refuse to sign" the editorial Mainstream Science on Intelligence. In 2003, he and colleagues published a study showing that heritability was higher for IQ differences within high socioeconomic status (SES) people than among low SES people, i.e., genes influenced differences between children's test scores more among high SES than among low SES children.

=== Humanistic views ===
Gottesman researched and published on the abuse of genetic research in Nazi Germany, and provided expert testimony in a Chinese human rights case involving schizophrenia in the family. His scholarly books on schizophrenia also highlighted the human costs of the disorder. In Schizophrenia Genesis: The Origins of Madness, he provided chapters in which patients describe their experiences of the disease, and those of their families. He opposed the Nazi-associated Pioneer Fund, which funded some of his colleagues. Gottesman emphasized that genetics influences patients' behavior in concert with the family, social, economic, and cultural contexts. Gottesman also highlighted random events as an important "third element" determining behavior and what unfolds as apparent destiny. In his writings, he reflected that the interaction between these elements is known only at the level of probabilities, and not as fixed and precise quantities.

== Books ==
Gottesman authored nine books, all related to schizophrenia and psychiatric genetics.

=== Schizophrenia and Genetics: A Twin Study Vantage Point ===
Gottesman and Shields published Schizophrenia and Genetics to document their twin-study research at the Maudsley Hospital in London, the work that in part earned them the Hofheimer Prize for Research, the highest award for psychiatric research from the American Psychiatric Association. The study expanded on an earlier one by Eliot Slater at the same hospital, covering 24 identical and 33 fraternal twins, with at least one from every pair a schizophrenic being treated at the hospital between 1948 and 1964. This study was one of eleven such in the contemporary literature, and the book detailed the methodology and analytic detail differentiating it from the others.

Chapters on methodology comprise a third of the book's core. Identical and fraternal twins were classified using fingerprints and blood groups. Follow-up interviews were recorded to monitor the progress of their patients (the probands) and their twins, some schizophrenic and others not. Two psychological tests—the MMPI and the Object Sorting Test (Goldstein Scheerer Test of Concept Formation)—were used to measure mental traits and functioning. Case summaries were prepared by the Scandinavian psychiatrist Erick Essen-Moller, and these were sent, with data on identical-or-fraternal-twin status and diagnosis-of-schizophrenia removed, to six judges from the U.S., U.K. and Japan. The judges independently evaluated whether the patients were schizophrenic.

Results of studies comprise another third of the core of Schizophrenia and Genetics. The data showed that genes made a person likely to develop schizophrenia under environmental pressures. The study was not designed to find the genes responsible, but the authors hypothesized there would be several acting in tandem.Contextual elements responsible could not be identified, though some, such as an overly protective mother, birth order, natal weight, and social and economic elements were ruled out. Gottesman and Shields found roughly half of identical twins had a shared schizophrenic or non-schizophrenic status, but only one-eleventh of fraternal twins had such a shared diagnosis. MMPI scales coincided among identical twin pairs but not among fraternal twin pairs. The Object Sorting Test showed no useful relations. Those meeker than their twins were more liable to develop schizophrenia where their genes already put them at risk.

The book presents case histories of all the twin-pairs studied and the raw data from the analyses. Its last chapters put the results in the context of existing studies, and presented a new theory and model to explain the causes and continuance of the disorder. The environmental aspects the researchers checked drew on existing literature, and multiple judgments were pooled to both compare and mutually cancel differing criteria for diagnosing schizophrenia. The theory in the book was that many genes work together to dispose a person to the disorder under certain environmental pressures. The model provided no specific therapeutic insight, but was useful as a guideline for further study.

=== Schizophrenia: The Epigenetic Puzzle ===
Schizophrenia: The Epigenetic Puzzle outlined the approaches, conclusions and models Gottesman used in his study of schizophrenia. He co-wrote the book with James Shields, who died before it was published. The book introduces methods for diagnosing schizophrenia in a research setting, taking into account national differences in how the disorder was defined, debunked myths such as the mother transmitting schizophrenia, and introduced the concepts of the threshold model and the reaction range.

The book provided a tutorial on genetics to make the material self-contained. Family, adoption and twin studies were investigated to determine the ways vulnerability to the disorder changed with genetic similarity to the patient. Together they supported the presence of a genetic contribution to the cause and the progress of schizophrenia. Contextual elements such as birth problems and stressful incidents were also analyzed to help the authors build a combined model to explain the disorder. The researchers analyzed populations to determine the role of genes using simplified mathematical models of the influence of genes and the environment on each other, and with no biochemical signal of the disorder to guide them. Rue L. Cromwell, writing in PsycCRITIQUES, wrote that this approach lacked rigor. The role of genes was less emphasized in the results, with a heritability of 70%, than in earlier studies by Kallman. The researchers investigated neuroanatomy, and specifically the neurotransmitter dopamine, as a possible route by which genes influence the functioning of the brain to produce the symptoms of the disorder.

The authors investigated autism and psychiatric disorders among children, but found little relation to adult schizophrenia or genetic influence. They also covered the social implications of the disease, concluding that most schizophrenics were poor because the disorder eroded their resources and abilities. A chapter was devoted to social issues, violence, illnesses, death rates, sexual aspects, and the ability to father or bear children affecting schizophrenics. The authors provided data on the chance of relapse after an episode of the disorder. The book covered new methods and new models for studying schizophrenia. Because the disorder had no unanimously accepted diagnostic criteria, the researchers asked six clinicians and three colleagues to provide their analyses on the reports on 120 twins, and found an agreement of 86% among the clinicians. Averaging the criteria of the clinicians produced a set close to that of Manfred Bleuler, who had adapted it from Emil Kraepelin.

=== Schizophrenia Genesis: The Origins of Madness ===
Schizophrenia Genesis: The Origins of Madness, written in 1991, won the William James award from the American Psychological Association. It extensively reviewed how science has looked at schizophrenia. The book presented a vulnerability/diathesis–stress model to explain the causes of the disorder and a many-cause, many-gene model to explain how it is passed from parents to children. The book has been translated into Japanese and German. Schizophrenia Genesis was written for both the lay person and the clinical professional, and provides data, methods of interpreting the data, and an introduction to genetic analysis as used to analyze role of inheritance in behavior. The book also contains accounts of schizophrenics, with an artist depicting own suffering, saying, "I know ... it is craziness when every laugh is about me ... newspapers suddenly contain cures ... sparkles of light are demon eyes."

Schizophrenia Genesis starts with the history of schizophrenia. Gottesman takes the view that schizophrenia is a disease of the industrial world. because it is not mentioned in the Bible, by the ancient Greeks, the ancient physicians, or authors including Shakespeare. He saw it first mentioned by physicians in 1809 and by Balzac in a short story in 1832, showing minimally the disorder had by then been recognized as such. In 1896, Kraepelin defined its symptoms, and his student Ernst Rüdin began a genetic study of its transmission in 1916.} The book noted that schizophrenia existed across cultures and its rates had stayed steady for fifty years.

A chapter was devoted to criteria for determining schizophrenia, with Gottesman preferring those developed by Bleuler to those in the American Psychiatric Association's Diagnostic and Statistical Manual of Mental Disorders (version III-R), the International Classification of Diseases (ICD-9) and Kurt Schneider’s method. Diagnosis was based on the ways a person spoke and acted, and the standard measures were hallucinations, delusions, emotional apathy, jumbled thought, and sudden changes in a person. Gottesman mentioned a disparity in schizophrenia diagnosis after World War II across the Atlantic, when U.S. psychiatric diagnoses quadrupled those of British psychiatrists.

Family studies on schizophrenia were reviewed. That the disorder runs in families did not suggest it was genetically inherited, since cultural transmission occurs from parents to children. Twin and adoption studies were presented as the standard methods to disentangle contributions from genes and the environment. Gottesman used a computer-based method for calculating the odds of becoming schizophrenic based on the many causes. The book examines the problems caused by schizophrenia for relatives of patients and for society at large, larger-scale ones exemplified by the eugenics policies of states such as Nazi Germany. Two final chapters cover molecular biology and neuroanatomy briefly. Newer methods of behavioral genetics being researched at the time of publication, such as linkage analysis which used the likelihood of neighboring genes being inherited together, were not covered.

== Committees and organizations ==
Gottesman is or has been:

- an attendee at the Society for the Study of Social Biology 1967 conference at Princeton University which laid the groundwork for the Behavior Genetics Association (BGA);
- president-elect and program chair of the BGA in 1976;
- American Psychological Association (APA) member from 1958, and a fellow since 1975;
- a fellow of the American Psychiatric Association;
- a fellow of the American Psychological Society;
- the vice-president of the Society for the Study of Social Biology for 1976–1980;
- the president of the Behavior Genetics Association in 1976–1977;
- member of the American Society of Human Genetics;
- the president of the Society for Research in Psychopathology in 1993; and
- a fellow of the American Academy of Arts and Sciences.

== Awards ==
Gottesman has been recognized by professional organizations in the United States, Britain, and Japan. He has received the following awards:

- Hofheimer Prize for Research in 1973 from the American Psychiatric Association;
- Dobzhansky Lifetime Achievement Award in 1990 from the Behavior Genetics Association;
- William James Book Award in 1991 from the APA Division of General Psychology;
- Kurt Schneider Prize from the University of Bonn (Germany) (the first non-German to win the prize);
- Distinguished Scientific Contributions Award in 2001 from the APA, is highest honor (previous honorees include Jean Piaget and B.F. Skinner;
- Gold Medal Award for Life Achievement in the Science of Psychology in 2007 from the American Psychological Foundation;
- Outstanding Achievement for Research on Mental Health Disorders NARSAD (National Alliance for Research in Schizophrenia and Affective Disorders) Award in 2008 from the Brain & Behavior Research Foundation and
- University of Louisville Grawemeyer Award in Psychology 2013
- James McKeen Cattell Fellow Award from the Association for Psychological Science.

== Books ==
- Gottesman, Irving I.; Erlenmeyer-Kimling, L. (1970). Differential Reproduction in Individuals with Mental and Physical Disorders: Conference Sponsored by the American Eugenics Society and the Biomedical Division of the Population Council Held at the Rockefeller University, Nov. 13–14, 1970. University of Chicago Press. p. 136.
- Gottesman, Irving I.; Shields, James T. (1972). Schizophrenia and Genetics: A Twin Study Vantage Point. Boston: Academic Press. p. 433. ISBN 978-0-12-293450-6.
- Gottesman, Irving I.; Shields, James T. (1973). Schizophrenia and Genetics (Personality and psychopathology). Boston: Academic Press. p. 433. ISBN 978-0122934506.
- —— (1982). Schizophrenia. Cambridge, UK: Cambridge University Press. p. 249. ISBN 978-0521295598.
- Gottesman, Irving I.; Shields, James T. (1982). Schizophrenia: The Epigenetic Puzzle. Cambridge, UK: Cambridge University Press. p. 258. ISBN 978-0-521-29559-8.
- —— (1991). Schizophrenia Genesis: The Origins of Madness. San Francisco: Freeman. p. 296. ISBN 978-0-7167-2147-5.
- Shields, James T.; Gottesman, Irving I. (1971). Man, Mind, and Heredity: Selected Papers of Eliot Slater on Psychiatry and Genetics. The Johns Hopkins University Press. p. 432. ISBN 978-0801811180.
- Fuller, Torrey E.; Bowler, Ann E.; Taylor, Edward H.; Gottesman, Irving I. (1995). Schizophrenia and manic-depressive disorder: The biological roots of mental illness as revealed by the landmark study of identical twins. Basic Books. p. 304. ISBN 978-0465072859.
- McGuffin, Peter; Owen, Michael, J.; Gottesman, Irving I. (2004). Psychiatric Genetics and Genomics. Oxford University Press. p. 502. ISBN 978-0198564867.

== Sources ==
- Bertelsen, Aksel (2011). "Irving Gottesman and schizophrenia spectrum". In Michael S. Ritsner (ed.). Handbook of schizophrenia spectrum disorders: Volume 1, Conceptual issues and neurobiological advances. New York, NY: Springer.
- "ASHG statement on eugenics and the misuse of genetic information to restrict reproductive freedom" (PDF). American Society of Human Genetics. October 1998. Archived from the original (PDF) on April 25, 2013.
- "Dean award nominations". American College of Psychiatrists.
- "Distinguished scientist awardees". Society for a Science of Clinical Psychology.
- "Editorial board". Biodemography and Social Biology. 16 (1): ebi. 1969. doi:10.1080/19485565.1969.9987793.
- Suzy Frisch (October 2012). "Pulse: Pioneer in Behavioral Genetics". Minnesota Medicine (University of Minnesota).
- Gottesman, I.I. (2001). "Redux: The James Shields Memorial Award for twin research". Twin Research. 4 (6): 484–485. doi:10.1375/1369052012713. PMID 11780941.
- "Psychology professors Sandra Scarr and Irving Gottesman are honored". UVA Today (University of Virginia). June 1, 1995. Archived from the original on March 3, 2016.
- Segal, N.L. (2001). "Behaviour genetic principles—development, personality, and psychopathology: A Festschrift in honour of Prof. Irving I. Gottesman. June 8.9, 2001, University of Minnesota, Minneapolis MN, USA". Twin Research. 4 (4): 275–284. doi:10.1375/1369052012407. PMID 11665308.
