= Joseph M. Horn =

American psychologist and geneticist (born 1940)

- Born: August 9, 1940 (age 86); America
- Education: Oklahoma State University (BS); University of Minnesota (MA, PhD)
- Known for: Minnesota Texas Adoption Research Project
- Scientific career
- Fields: Psychology, behavioral genetics
- Workplaces: University of Texas at Austin

Joseph M. Horn (August 9, 1940 - November 4, 2021) was an American psychologist and geneticist known for his work on adoption studies.

== Biography ==
Horn earned his Bachelor of Science degree at Oklahoma State University in 1963 and his Master of Arts at the University of Minnesota in 1967. He received his Ph.D. from the University of Minnesota in 1969. Horn taught at the University of Texas at Austin. His research interests include intelligence and personality and their development, individual differences more generally, and vocational behavior. His research using behavior genetics is perhaps most influential.

Importantly, he initiated the Texas Adoption Project in 1972, recruiting over 500 adopted children, their biological mothers, and adoptive parents and sibs. This ongoing longitudinal study has led to numerous publications shedding light on human development and the roles of genes and environments in behavior

The key, surprising, findings are summarized in this quote:

The first phase of the study tested the personality and intelligence of adopted children between three and fourteen years-old; then the study re-tested them again as adolescents and young adults ten years later. Not only were the adoptees much more like their biological mothers than their adoptive mothers, but as they grew older, they became increasingly more similar to the biological parents they had not seen since shortly after their birth, and the less like the adopting parents who had raised them. By adolescence, the adoptees showed virtually no similarity to their adopting parents or the adoptive siblings with whom they had been raised. The study concluded that about fifty percent of the individual differences in IQ and personality were due to heredity and the remainder to [unshared] environmental influences.

In 1994 he was one of 52 signatories on "Mainstream Science on Intelligence", an editorial written by Linda Gottfredson and published in the Wall Street Journal, which declared the consensus of the signing scholars on issues related to intelligence research following the publication of the book The Bell Curve.

== Selected works ==
- Horn, J. M., Loehlin, J. C., & Willerman, L. (1979). Intellectual resemblance among adoptive and biological relatives. Behavior Genetics, 9, 177–207.
- Horn, J. M. (1983). The Texas Adoption Project: Adopted children and their intellectual resemblance to biological and adoptive parents. Child Development, 54, 268–275.
- Loehlin, J. C., Horn, J. M., & Willerman, L. (1990). Heredity, environment, and personality change: Evidence from the Texas Adoption Project. Journal of Personality, 58, 221–243.
