= Kathryn Paige Harden =

American psychologist and behavioral geneticist

- Harden at the 2026 Texas Book Festival
- Born: Kathryn Paige Harden; United States
- Education: Furman University (B.S.); Virginia University (M.A., Ph.D.)
- Spouse: Elliot Tucker-Drob (2010–2017)
- Children: 2
- Awards: Award for Distinguished Scientific Early Career Contributions to Psychology from the American Psychological Association (2017)
- Scientific career
- Fields: Behavioral genetics; social genomics
- Workplaces: University of Texas at Austin
- Thesis: A behavior genetic study of religiosity and adolescent problem behavior (2009)
- Doctoral advisor: Eric Turkheimer

Kathryn Paige Harden is an American psychologist and behavioral geneticist who is Professor of Psychology at the University of Texas at Austin. She leads the Developmental Behavior Genetics lab and acts as co-director of the Texas Twin Project. She is also a Faculty Research Associate at the University of Texas at Austin's Population Research Center and a Jacobs Foundation research fellow. Harden has advocated for an increased role of genetic research in psychology and the social sciences.

== Early life and education ==
Harden and her younger brother Micah grew up in a conservative environment in an exurb of Memphis, Tennessee. Her paternal grandparents were Pentecostals who worked as farmers and pipeline workers in Texas. Her father was a pilot in the U.S. Navy who later flew planes for FedEx.

She received a full scholarship to Furman University, a formerly Baptist college in South Carolina, where she worked in a lab on rodent genetics research. She graduated with a B.S. degree magna cum laude in psychology, and was in Phi Beta Kappa. She obtained an M.A. degree in 2005 and a Ph.D. in 2009, both in clinical psychology from the University of Virginia. Her doctoral advisor was Eric Turkheimer. She began working at the University of Texas the same year.

== Research ==
Harden's research has focused on using genetic data to understand individual differences in child and adolescent development. She has published papers on the psychological consequences of early puberty and early age at first sexual intercourse, on delinquency and antisocial behavior, and on intelligence and academic achievement. In a review article, Harden argued for a "sex-positive framework for research on adolescent sexuality" that considers "consensual sexual activities in adolescence as developmentally normative and potentially healthy," in contrast to a "risk" framework "that presumes that abstinence from sexual activity is the ideal behavioral outcome for teenagers."

She was a recipient of the American Psychological Association's Award for Distinguished Scientific Early Career Contributions to Psychology in 2017, in honor of her research on "how to integrate genetic knowledge with the classical clinical and developmental insights into human behavior".

In a 2018 editorial in the New York Times, Harden argued that genetic research on human individual differences is compatible with progressive and egalitarian social goals. In September 2021, Harden published a book on the same concept, The Genetic Lottery: Why DNA Matters for Social Equality, which summarized the history and modern forefront of genetic research and argued that "the science of genetics can help create a more just and equal society".

== Criticism ==
Despite her description of her own agenda as "antieugenic," Harden has been criticized by fellow researchers for effectively arguing in favor of principles of eugenics, and for supporting debunked theories and poor methodology in the process. Milder criticism asserted that Harden's policy suggestions were only tenuously supported by genetics, and held less promise than structural reforms. These criticisms were raised after her first book, The Genetic Lottery, and were voiced again in response to her 2026 book, Original Sin: On the Genetics of Vice, the Problem of Blame, and the Future of Forgiveness.

== Books ==
- The Genetic Lottery: Why DNA Matters for Social Equality (2021)
- Original Sin: On the Genetics of Vice, the Problem of Blame, and the Future of Forgiveness (2026)
