= Minnesota Texas Adoption Research Project =

Research study

The Minnesota / Texas Adoption Research Project (MTARP) is a longitudinal research study that focuses on the consequences of variations in openness in adoption arrangements for all members of the adoptive kinship network: birthmothers, adoptive parents, and adopted children, and for the relationships within these family systems.

MTARP is a joint project between the University of Minnesota and University of Texas at Austin and involves interviews with adoptive parents and birth mothers. The Principal Investigators of the study are Harold D. Grotevant, University of Minnesota, and Ruth G. McRoy, University of Texas at Austin. Co-investigators include Gretchen Wrobel, Bethel University, St. Paul, MN, Martha Rueter, University of Minnesota, Susan Ayers-Lopez, University of Texas at Austin, and Sarah Friese, University of Minnesota. It is funded primarily by the National Institute of Child Health and Human Development, National Science Foundation, William T. Grant Foundation, Office of Population Affairs, and Rudd Family Foundation Chair in Psychology at the University of Massachusetts Amherst.

Each of the families in the project adopted a child in the late 1970s or early 1980s. Families and birthmothers were first interviewed between 1987 and 1992 and again between 1996 and 2000. Grotevant and colleagues at the Minnesota site have followed the adopted children and their adoptive parents (e.g., Grotevant, Ross, Marchel, & McRoy, 1999; Dunbar & Grotevant, 2004); McRoy and colleagues at the University of Texas at Austin have followed the children’s birthmothers (e.g., Christian, et al., 1997; Fravel, et al., 2000). Adoptive families and birthmothers were recruited for the study through 35 adoption agencies located across the United States.

Families where there was at least one adopted child (the "target child") between the ages of 4 and 12 at the time of the interview, who was adopted through an agency before his or her first birthday, and in which both adoptive parents were married to the partner they had at the time of the adoption were selected for the study. Transracial, international, or "special needs" adoptees were not included. Participants in the study were located in 23 different states from all regions of the U.S., making this study the only nationwide one of its kind.
