= Genomics of personality traits =

Personality traits are patterns of thoughts, feelings and behaviors that reflect the tendency to respond in certain ways under certain circumstances.

Personality is influenced by genetic and environmental factors and associated with mental health. Beside the environment factor, genetic variants can be detected for personality traits. These traits are polygenic. Significant genetic variants are present for most of the behavioral traits. There is a consistency in detection of genetic variants and genomic association for traits derived from pedigree.

Personality trait research has been conducted both for humans and non-human animals like dogs.

== Trait theory ==
For humans, the Big Five personality traits, also known as the five-factor model (FFM) or the OCEAN model, is the prevailing model for personality traits. When factor analysis (a statistical technique) is applied to personality survey data, some words or questionnaire items used to describe aspects of personality are often applied to the same person. For example, someone described as conscientious is more likely to be described as "always prepared" rather than "messy". This theory uses descriptors of common language and therefore suggests five broad dimensions commonly used to describe the human personality and psyche.

The five factors are:

- Openness to experience (inventive/curious vs. consistent/cautious)
- Conscientiousness (efficient/organized vs. easy-going/careless)
- Extraversion (outgoing/energetic vs. solitary/reserved)
- Agreeableness (friendly/compassionate vs. challenging/detached)
- Neuroticism (sensitive/nervous vs. secure/confident).

== Methods ==
The methods mostly used in genomics of personality traits' studies are two: analytic methods and non-analytic ones (such as questionnaires).

=== Analytic ===
Analytical techniques that can be used to measure genomics of personality include:

1. GWAS, genome wide association study is a method used to define markers (these markers are single nucleotide polymorphism, SNPs) across the genomes in order to better understand the contribution of genetics to personality traits. Since SNPs occur in the DNA between genes, GWAS technique aims to find those genes that are associated with certain personality traits, for example neuroticism was reported to be associated with intronic variant in MAGI1 and openness with variants near RASA1. Recently, UK Biobank achieved several SNPs that are associated with neuroticism. The first GWAS studies on all five human personality factors (i.e. neuroticism, extraversion, openness to experience, conscientiousness and agreeableness) used a sample of 3972 individuals from an isolated population on Sardinia, Italy, and found 362 129 SNPs.
2. DNA genotyping, which can be performed through different kits, for example:
  - The CanineHD BeadChip containing 173,662 validated SNPs derived from the Dog Genome Sequencing Project. This chip has 99.99% of reproducibility, it is a PCR-free protocol, it provides a uniform genome-wide coverage by the 70 markers placed on the platform, it has a high-throughput (up to 12 samples in parallel) and it can be applied to the interrogation of genetic variation in any domestic dog breed. The full set of SNPs that it contains can be analysed with the purpose of explaining the proportion of the phenotypic traits' variances and to show the "genomic heritabilities" of the traits (considering the total of the autosomal and X-linked estimates). For example, the study that used this approach revealed a significant genetic variance present for most of the behavioural traits examined.
  - The Infinium OmniExpress-24 BeadChip array containing 710,000 SNPs.
3. RNA sequencing can provide a more precise elucidation of common genetic influences on gene expression in the developing brain and the molecular differences that could confer susceptibility to neuropsychiatric disorders. With this technique combined to the GWAS, it was possible, to provide the first eQTL dataset derived exclusively from the human fetal brain. One example of protocol used to do it is the following: total RNA was treated with DNase and purified. Integrity of RNA was assessed and then RNA-Seq libraries were prepared using 1 μg of purified total RNA, depleting ribosomal RNA and modifying the RNA fragmentation times for lower RIN samples (<7). Also library size was assessed and then libraries were quantified. At the end, libraries were sequenced, generating at least 50 million read pairs (100 million reads) per sample.
4. Whole-Genome Bisulfite Sequencing (WGBS) to examine DNA methylation in cellular subpopulations isolated from human brain tissue. This analysis is important, because DNA methylation differences between neuronal and non-neuronal populations have been widely reported and many neuropsychiatric diseases preferentially affect neuronal subpopulations present in particular brain regions. An example of WGBS protocol is the following: samples were fragmented and then they were bisulfite converted after size selection. Amplification was performed after the bisulfite conversion using Kapa Hifi Uracil + polymerase at the following cycling conditions: 98 °C 45 s/8 cycles: 98 °C 15 s, 65 °C 30 s, 72 °C 30 s/72 °C 1 min. Final libraries were run for quality control purposes. Then, libraries were quantified by qPCR. Libraries were also sequenced using a 125 bp paired-end single indexed run.
5. Candidate gene approach focus on genes whose function suggests an association with a trait. Originally, it was assumed that few key genes were responsible for the observed heritable variance of personality features. Even though the complexity behind the polygenicity of personality traits was demonstrated, candidate gene studies are still performed today. The small number of genes selected for this type of studies are included in neurotransmission patterns, like the ones involving dopamine and serotonin. The most studied candidate genes and polymorphism related to personality, with the most informative meta-analyses, are DRD4 and 5HTT. DRD4 encodes for the D4 dopamine receptor, while 5HTT encodes for a serotonin transporter responsible for the reuptake of this neurotransmitter. According to some publications, SNPs in DRD4 are associated with extraversion and novelty seeking. Also variations in 5HTT are associated with neuroticism and harm avoidance.
6. Family and twins studies: The studies of genomics of personality traits involves families and specifically twins, because they have a high heritability of the traits. The families and twins studies have shown that personality traits are moderately heritable, and can predict various lifetime outcomes, including psychopathology. The identical twins have a heritability of 40%, suggesting that the additive genetic effects are responsible for the variance of personality traits for a moderate portion. Family and adoption studies have yielded of approximately 30%. The sex is not involved in heritability of personality traits, on the other end environmental differences can increase or decrease the importance of genetic factors. Twins data shows that genetic influences contribute to personality stability and are relatively constant with age whereas environmental influence on personality increases with age. In addition, twin and family studies show strong genetic correlations across diverse cognitive domains, suggesting pleiotropy, and across levels of ability, substantiating the view of general intelligence as an etiological continuum. The families have members affected by psychiatric disorder, because these diseases can be considered as extremes of normal tendencies and personal traits. It is intended to foster a biological analysis of behavior in order to study neurological disorder and find a correlation with human personality, meaning that heritable variation in personality traits would share a common genetic basis with psychiatric diseases. The geneticists define the phenotype of the patients following the Human Phenotype Ontology (HPO) which provides a standardized vocabulary of phenotypic abnormalities encountered in human disease. The study of complex trait in genetics presents a gap defined as "missing heritability", so a single genetic variations cannot account for much of the heritability of diseases, behaviors, and other phenotypes. For example, a person susceptibility to disease may depend more on the combined effect of all the genes in the background than on the disease genes in the foreground, or the role of genes may have been severely overestimated.

=== Non analytic ===
Non-analytic methods mainly use approach is that of questionnaire, here discuss:

Questionnaires:

As previously mentioned, questionnaires were often used as another tool to analyze the association of a behaviour to genetic variances.

In some studies, questionnaires were indirectly given at the owners of the animals involved in the experiment and in other studies they were directly given to the patients involved. These questionnaires were:

1. C-BARQ, which stands for Canine Behavioural Assessment and Research Questionnaire. It is a survey-based approach used in a large number of studies on dog behaviour, where the dog owner's answers to validated questionnaires to assess the personality traits of the dog. C-BARQ was developed at the University of Pennsylvania and its reliability, validity and standardized test scores support its use as a tool in behavioural researches. The C-BARQ survey contains 101 questions regarding the dog's behavioural response to various situations, with answers marked on a five-step scale. Depending on the results obtained from the compilation of the survey the dogs are divided into 11-14 behavioural traits' groups.
2. Demographic questionnaires about general information of the dogs, such as sex, neuter status, housing, coat colour, health status, exercise per day and "Role" (based on the activities of the dog). The data obtained from questionnaires can be analysed by the Mixed Linear Model (REML) approach, that provides a consistent and accurate estimation of non-normally-distributed traits. This approach can be implemented using software as ASReml.
3. Self-report questionnaires, which investigate several aspects of participants' life. Some examples are the following:
  - The Eysenck Personality Questionnaire (EPQ), defines 3 traits of personality: psychoticism (characterized by aggressiveness and interpersonal hostility), extraversion (manifested in outgoing, energetic behaviour) and neuroticism (typified by emotional stability).
  - The Tridimensional Personality Questionnaire (TPQ) defines 3 traits of personality that are based on the biochemical bases of temperament: novelty seeking, harm avoidance and reward dependence.
  - The Temperament and Character Inventory (TCI) defines 4 personality: persistence (or perseverance despite fatigue or frustration), self-directedness (the ability to modify behaviour in order to achieve personal goals), cooperativeness (the tendency to exhibit agreeable relations with others) and self-transcendence (associated with experiencing spiritual aspects of the self).
  - The Five Factor model (NEO-PI) is based on biological mechanisms shaping 5 higher-order traits (the big five): neuroticism (proneness to experience negative affect), extraversion (motivation to engage with others), openness to experience (inventive or curious behaviour), agreeableness (friendliness and compassion toward others) and conscientiousness (attentive and organized behaviour). This questionnaire is the most commonly used for genetic studies and it has also derivative types, such as the NEO-PI-R and NEO-FFI.
  - UK Biobank self-report questionnaire has several questions related to loneliness and social isolation and it permit to identify cases and controls and then also to compare genetic differences.

Some examples of questions are: 'Do you often feel lonely?', to which individuals answered 'yes' (recorded as cases) or 'no' (controls); other questions are based on the quality of social interactions as: 'How often are you able to confide in someone close to you?' (cases were defined as those who answered 'Never or almost never', controls were defined as those who answered 'Almost daily').

== Correlation with psychiatric disorders ==
Scientists demonstrated that most of personality traits cluster together and they also cluster with most neuropsychiatric disorders and are therefore related. In research, scientists used linkage disequilibrium regression score to investigate the correlation between personality traits and psychiatric disorder. According to LDSC, there is a positive correlation between major depression disorder and neuroticism and a small correlation between schizophrenia and neuroticism; these correlation have also been confirmed in twins studies. Also, neuroticism and openness show strong genetic correlation. Besides, scientists found that there is a positive correlation between first principal component and all psychiatric disorders, but first principal component showed negative correlation with conscientiousness and agreeableness.

Personality features are highly linked with mental, social and physical outcome. For example, scientists realized that schizophrenia and bipolar disorders cluster with openness. Moreover, they demonstrated that ADHD shows the highest correlation with personality trait especially extraversion. Recently, the negative correlation between neuroticism and loneliness was identified as well as a strong correlation between anxiety and neuroticism. Plus, narcissism, psychopathy and Machiavellianism have association with low agreeableness. In general, neuroticism and other personality traits show negative correlation, while openness, extraversion, agreeableness and conscientiousness shows positive correlation.

Example for the genes that they find to be correlative are:

Within 8p23.1, MTMR9 has intronic variant which has association with extraversion and also with neuroticism shows inverse association. Another one is 12q23.3, WSCD2 which is found for extraversion, by using GWAS, it had been shown that this locus has association with bipolar disorder. In addition, L3MBTL2 is associated with both schizophrenia and neuroticism. Another gene is DRD4 which has association with both ADHD and novelty seeking behavior.

== Examples ==
1. Genetic basis of Dog Personality Traits: in different genomes of dogs, several SNPs are found close to genes with known neurological or behavioral functions. The TH (tyrosin hydroxylase) gene, whose product is LDOPA, the precursor of the neurotransmitter dopamine, is located 1 Mb from the SNP on CFA18 associated with agitated behaviour. Mutation in this gene cause hyperactivity disorder. The TH gene has been associated with activity, impassivity, and inattention in two dog breeds. The SNP associated with NoiseFear is located 0.27 Mb from CADPS2 on CFA20. CADPS2 is a member of a gene family encoding calcium-binding proteins that regulate the exocytosis of neuropeptide encompassing (dense-core) vesicles from neurons and neuron endocrine cells. The gene and its variants have been associated with autism in humans and noise phobia reported for dogs with this SNPs. Similar SNPs in dogs and in humans are correlated with the same gene which has different outcomes in terms of personality traits.
2. Intelligence is one of the traits that are affected by genetics. Inherited DNA differences are responsible for substantial individual differences in intelligence test scores the 10% variance in intelligence scores explained by the SNP heritability.
3. From twins studies it is possible to consider neuroticism as a heritable trait, as shown in a meta-analysis of data from over 29 000 twin pairs, in which they found this correlation in 16 twin pairs, independently from the sex of individuals.

== Limitations ==
- GWAS studies require very large sample size in order to be able to identify the polymorphisms which are responsible for the variance observed, since personality traits are influenced by many genes, each one explaining only a small amount of variations (1 – 2%).
- Whole genome bisulfite sequence method has some limitations, because it is an exclusively qualitative method, so, it is possible to analyze the methylation status of only a limited number of CpG dinucleotides.
- Candidate gene association studies led to inconsistent and inconclusive results due to the fact that the effect of the loci under study was considered to be much larger than it really was, wrong assumptions were made regarding the importance of genes related to key neurotransmitter systems, regulatory and noncoding regions were not taken into consideration.
- Family and twins studies may result in the confounding of pedigree genetic effects with shared family environmental effects. Moreover, shared environment effects could obscure dominance variation causing dizygotic twins to appear more alike than monozygotic twins.

== See also ==
- Big Five personality traits
