= Genome-wide complex trait analysis =

Statistical method for genetic variance component estimation

Genome-wide complex trait analysis (GCTA) or genome-based restricted maximum likelihood (GREML) is a statistical method for heritability estimation in genetics, which quantifies the total additive contribution of a set of genetic variants to a trait. GCTA is typically applied to common single nucleotide polymorphisms (SNPs) on a genotyping array (or "chip") and thus termed "chip" or "SNP" heritability.

GCTA operates by directly quantifying the chance genetic similarity of unrelated individuals and comparing it to their measured similarity on a trait; if two unrelated individuals are relatively similar genetically and also have similar trait measurements, then the measured genetics are likely to causally influence that trait, and the correlation can to some degree tell how much. This can be illustrated by plotting the squared pairwise trait differences between individuals against their estimated degree of relatedness. GCTA makes a number of modeling assumptions and whether/when these assumptions are satisfied continues to be debated.

The GCTA framework has also been extended in a number of ways: quantifying the contribution from multiple SNP categories (i.e. functional partitioning); quantifying the contribution of Gene-Environment interactions; quantifying the contribution of non-additive/non-linear effects of SNPs; and bivariate analyses of multiple phenotypes to quantify their genetic covariance (co-heritability or genetic correlation).

GCTA estimates have implications for the potential for discovery from Genome-wide Association Studies (GWAS) as well as the design and accuracy of polygenic scores. GCTA estimates from common variants are typically substantially lower than other estimates of total or narrow-sense heritability (such as from twin or kinship studies), which has contributed to the debate over the Missing heritability problem.

== History ==
Estimation in biology/animal breeding using standard ANOVA/REML methods of variance components such as heritability, shared-environment, maternal effects etc. typically requires individuals of known relatedness such as parent/child; this is often unavailable or the pedigree data unreliable, leading to inability to apply the methods or requiring strict laboratory control of all breeding (which threatens the external validity of all estimates), and several authors have noted that relatedness could be measured directly from genetic markers (and if individuals were reasonably related, economically few markers would have to be obtained for statistical power), leading Kermit Ritland to propose in 1996 that directly measured pairwise relatedness could be compared to pairwise phenotype measurements (Ritland 1996, "A Marker-based Method for Inferences About Quantitative Inheritance in Natural Populations").

As genome sequencing costs dropped steeply over the 2000s, acquiring enough markers on enough subjects for reliable estimates using very distantly related individuals became possible. An early application of the method to humans came with Visscher et al. 2006/2007, which used SNP markers to estimate the actual relatedness of siblings and estimate heritability from the direct genetics. In humans, unlike the original animal/plant applications, relatedness is usually known with high confidence in the 'wild population', and the benefit of GCTA is connected more to avoiding assumptions of classic behavioral genetics designs and verifying their results, and partitioning heritability by SNP class and chromosomes. The first use of GCTA proper in humans was published in 2010, finding 45% of variance in human height can be explained by the included SNPs. (Large GWASes on height have since confirmed the estimate.) The GCTA algorithm was then described and a software implementation published in 2011. It has since been used to study a wide variety of biological, medical, psychiatric, and psychological traits in humans, and inspired many variant approaches.

== Benefits ==
=== Robust heritability ===
Twin and family studies have long been used to estimate variance explained by particular categories of genetic and environmental causes. Across a wide variety of human traits studied, there is typically minimal shared-environment influence, considerable non-shared environment influence, and a large genetic component (mostly additive), which is on average ~50% and sometimes much higher for some traits such as height or intelligence. However, the twin and family studies have been criticized for their reliance on a number of assumptions that are difficult or impossible to verify, such as the equal environments assumption (that the environments of monozygotic and dizygotic twins are equally similar), that there is no misclassification of zygosity (mistaking identical for fraternal & vice versa), that twins are unrepresentative of the general population, and that there is no assortative mating. Violations of these assumptions can result in both upwards and downwards bias of the parameter estimates. (This debate & criticism have particularly focused on the heritability of IQ.)

The use of SNP or whole-genome data from unrelated subject participants (with participants too related, typically >0.025 or ~fourth cousins levels of similarity, being removed, and several principal components included in the regression to avoid & control for population stratification) bypasses many heritability criticisms: twins are often entirely uninvolved, there are no questions of equal treatment, relatedness is estimated precisely, and the samples are drawn from a broad variety of subjects.

In addition to being more robust to violations of the twin study assumptions, SNP data can be easier to collect since it does not require rare twins and thus also heritability for rare traits can be estimated (with due correction for ascertainment bias).

=== GWAS power ===
GCTA estimates can be used to resolve the missing heritability problem and design GWASes which will yield genome-wide statistically-significant hits. This is done by comparing the GCTA estimate with the results of smaller GWASes. If a GWAS of n=10k using SNP data fails to turn up any hits, but the GCTA indicates a high heritability accounted for by SNPs, then that implies that a large number of variants are involved (polygenicity) and thus that much larger GWASes will be required to accurately estimate each SNP's effect and directly account for a fraction of the GCTA heritability.

== Disadvantages ==
1. Limited inference: GCTA estimates are inherently limited in that they cannot estimate broadsense heritability like twin/family studies as they only estimate the heritability due to SNPs. Hence, while they serve as a critical check on the unbiasedness of the twin/family studies, GCTAs cannot replace them for estimating total genetic contributions to a trait.
2. Substantial data requirements: the number of SNPs genotyped per person should be in the thousands and ideally the hundreds of thousands for reasonable estimates of genetic similarity (although this is no longer such an issue for current commercial chips which default to hundreds of thousands or millions of markers); and the number of persons, for somewhat stable estimates of plausible SNP heritability, should be at least n>1000 and ideally n>10000. In contrast, twin studies can offer precise estimates with a fraction of the sample size.
3. Computational inefficiency: The original GCTA implementation scales poorly with increasing data size ($\mathcal{O}(\text{SNPs} \cdot n^2)$), so even if enough data is available for precise GCTA estimates, the computational burden may be unfeasible. GCTA can be meta-analyzed as a standard precision-weighted fixed-effect meta-analysis, so research groups sometimes estimate cohorts or subsets and then pool them meta-analytically (at the cost of additional complexity and some loss of precision). This has motivated the creation of faster implementations and variant algorithms which make different assumptions, such as using moment matching.
4. Need for raw data: GCTA requires genetic similarity of all subjects and thus their raw genetic information; due to privacy concerns, individual patient data is rarely shared. GCTA cannot be run on the summary statistics reported publicly by many GWAS projects, and if pooling multiple GCTA estimates, a meta-analysis must be performed.
  In contrast, there are alternative techniques which operate on summaries reported by GWASes without requiring the raw data e.g. "LD score regression" contrasts linkage disequilibrium statistics (available from public datasets like 1000 Genomes) with the public summary effect-sizes to infer heritability and estimate genetic correlations/overlaps of multiple traits. The Broad Institute runs LD Hub which provides a public web interface to >=177 traits with LD score regression. Another method using summary data is HESS.
5. Confidence intervals may be incorrect, or outside the 0-1 range of heritability, and highly imprecise due to asymptotics.
6. Underestimation of SNP heritability: GCTA implicitly assumes all classes of SNPs, rarer or commoner, newer or older, more or less in linkage disequilibrium, have the same effects on average; in humans, rarer and newer variants tend to have larger and more negative effects as they represent mutation load being purged by negative selection. As with measurement error, this will bias GCTA estimates towards underestimating heritability.

== Interpretation ==
GCTA provides an unbiased estimate of the total variance in phenotype explained by all variants included in the relatedness matrix (and any variation correlated with those SNPs). This estimate can also be interpreted as the maximum prediction accuracy (R^2) that could be achieved from a linear predictor using all SNPs in the relatedness matrix. The latter interpretation is particularly relevant to the development of Polygenic Risk Scores, as it defines their maximum accuracy. GCTA estimates are sometimes misinterpreted as estimates of total (or narrow-sense, i.e. additive) heritability, but this is not a guarantee of the method. GCTA estimates are likewise sometimes misinterpreted as "lower bounds" on the narrow-sense heritability but this is also incorrect: first because GCTA estimates can be biased (including biased upwards) if the model assumptions are violated, and second because, by definition (and when model assumptions are met), GCTA can provide an unbiased estimate of the narrow-sense heritability if all causal variants are included in the relatedness matrix. The interpretation of the GCTA estimate in relation to the narrow-sense heritability thus depends on the variants used to construct the relatedness matrix.

Most frequently, GCTA is run with a single relatedness matrix constructed from common SNPs and will not capture (or not fully capture) the contribution of the following factors:

1. Any rare or low-frequency variants that are not directly genotyped/imputed.
2. Any non-linear, dominance, or epistatic genetic effects. Note that GCTA can be extended to estimate the contribution of these effects through more complex relatedness matrices.
3. The effects of Gene-Environment interactions. Note that GCTA can be extended to estimate the contribution of GxE interactions when the E is known, by including additional variance components.
4. Structural variants, which are typically not genotyped or imputed.
5. Measurement error: GCTA does not model any uncertainty or error on the measured trait.

GCTA makes several model assumptions and may produce biased estimates under the following conditions:

1. The distribution of causal variants is systematically different from the distribution of variants included in the relatedness matrix (even if all causal variants are included in the relatedness matrix). For example, if causal variants are systematically at a higher/lower frequency or in higher/lower correlation than all genotyped variants. This can produce either an upwards or downwards bias depending on the relationship between the causal variants and variants used. Various extensions to GCTA have been proposed (for example, GREML-LDMS) to account for these distributional shifts.
2. Population stratification is not fully accounted for by covariates. GCTA (specifically GREML) accounts for stratification through the inclusion of fixed effect covariates, typically principal components. If these covariates do not fully capture the stratification the GCTA estimate will be biased, generally upwards. Accounting for recent population structure is particularly challenging for studies of rare variants.
3. Residual genetic or environmental relatedness present in the data. GCTA assumes a homogenous population with an independent and identically distributed environmental term. This assumption is violated if related individuals and/or individuals with substantially shared environments are included in the data. In this case, the GCTA estimate will additionally capture the contribution of any genetic variation correlated with the genetic relationship: either direct genetic effects or correlated environment.
4. The presence of "indirect" genetic effects. When genetic variants present in the relatedness matrix are correlated with variants present in other individuals that influence the participant's environment, those effects will also be captured in the GCTA estimate. For example, if variants inherited by a participant from their mother influenced their phenotype through their maternal environment, then the effect of those variants will be included in the GCTA estimate even though it is "indirect" (i.e. mediated by parental genetics). This may be interpreted as an upward bias as such "indirect" effects are not strictly causal (altering them in the participant would not lead to a change in phenotype in expectation).

== Implementations ==
GCTA
- Original author: Jian Yang
- Release: August 30, 2010; 15 years ago

Stable release(s)
- 1.26.0 / June 22, 2016; 10 years ago

Preview release(s)
- 1.93.2beta / May 8, 2020; 6 years ago
- Written in: C++
- Operating system: Linux macOS (not fully tested); Windows (not fully tested)
- Platform: x86_64
- Available in: English
- Type: Genetics
- License: GPL v3 (source code); MIT (executable files)
- Website: cnsgenomics.com/software/gcta/
- As of: 8 April 2021

The original "GCTA" software package is the most widely used; its primary functionality covers the GREML estimation of SNP heritability, but includes other functionality:

- Estimate the genetic relationship from genome-wide SNPs;
- Estimate the inbreeding coefficient from genome-wide SNPs;
- Estimate the variance explained by all the autosomal SNPs;
- Partition the genetic variance onto individual chromosomes;
- Estimate the genetic variance associated with the X-chromosome;
- Test the effect of dosage compensation on genetic variance on the X-chromosome;
- Predict the genome-wide additive genetic effects for individual subjects and for individual SNPs;
- Estimate the LD structure encompassing a list of target SNPs;
- Simulate GWAS data based upon the observed genotype data;
- Convert Illumina raw genotype data into PLINK format;
- Conditional & joint analysis of GWAS summary statistics without individual level genotype data
- Estimating the genetic correlation between two traits (diseases) using SNP data
- Mixed linear model association analysis

— GCTA, cnsgenomics.com/software/gcta/

Other implementations and variant algorithms include:

- FAST-LMM
- FAST-LMM-Select: like GCTA in using ridge regression but including feature selection to try to exclude irrelevant SNPs which only add noise to the relatedness estimates
- LMM-Lasso
- GEMMA
- EMMAX
- REACTA (formerly ACTA) claims order of magnitude runtime reductions
- BOLT-REML/BOLT-LMM (manual), faster & better scaling; with potentially better efficiency in the meta-analysis scenario
- MEGHA
- PLINK >1.9 (December 2013) supports "the use of genetic relationship matrices in mixed model association analysis and other calculations"
- LDAK: loosens the GCTA assumption that all SNPs, regardless of genotyping quality or frequency, have same averaged expected effect, allowing for potentially finding much more SNP heritability
- GREML-IBD: GCTA for identity by descent, attempting to estimate heritability based on shared genome segments in distant otherwise-unrelated relatives, in order to capture the effect of rarer variants which are not measured by SNP panels or otherwise imputed

== See also ==
- Animal breeding
- Best linear unbiased prediction
- Mendelian randomization
- Pleiotropy
- "The Correlation between Relatives on the Supposition of Mendelian Inheritance", Fisher 1918
