= NUS1 =

Human gene

Identifiers
- Aliases: NUS1, C6orf68, MGC:7199, NgBR, TANGO14, NUS1 dehydrodolichyl diphosphate synthase subunit, CDG1AA, MRD55, dehydrodolichyl diphosphate synthase subunit
- External IDs: OMIM: 610463; MGI: 1196365; GeneCards: NUS1
Enzyme activity
EC #	BRENDA	ExPASy	KEGG	MetaCyc
2.5.1.87	↗	↗	↗	↗

Gene location (Human)
Chr.	Chromosome 6 (human)
Band	6q22.1	Start	117,675,469 bp
Band	6q22.1	End	117,710,727 bp

Gene location (Mouse)
Chr.	Chromosome 10 (mouse)
Band	10 B3|10 26.64 cM	Start	52,293,643 bp
Band	10 B3|10 26.64 cM	End	52,316,279 bp
RNA expression pattern
Bgee	Human / Mouse (ortholog); Top expressed in: endometrium; tibia; islet of Langerhans; skin of arm; cartilage tissue; mucosa of ileum; oocyte; mucosa of nose; nasal epithelium; cardiac muscle tissue of right atrium / Top expressed in: human kidney; stroma of bone marrow; parotid gland; secondary oocyte; Epithelium of choroid plexus; olfactory tubercle; endothelial cell of lymphatic vessel; seminal vesicula; efferent ductule; globus pallidus; More reference expression data
BioGPS	n/a
Gene ontology
Molecular function	transferase activity; protein binding; prenyltransferase activity; transferase activity, transferring alkyl or aryl (other than methyl) groups; molecular function; dehydrodolichyl diphosphate synthase activity
Cellular component	integral component of membrane; endoplasmic reticulum membrane; membrane; endoplasmic reticulum; dehydrodolichyl diphosphate synthase complex
Biological process	cell differentiation; dolichol biosynthetic process; regulation of intracellular cholesterol transport; sterol homeostasis; multicellular organism development; protein glycosylation; angiogenesis; protein mannosylation; cholesterol homeostasis; vascular endothelial growth factor signaling pathway; positive regulation of blood vessel endothelial cell migration; positive regulation of nitric-oxide synthase activity; dolichyl diphosphate biosynthetic process; lipid metabolism
Sources:Amigo / QuickGO
Orthologs
Databases	NCBI: entry; OMA: entry
Species	Human	Mouse
Entrez	116150	52014
Ensembl	ENSG00000153989	ENSMUSG00000023068
UniProt	Q96E22	Q99LJ8
RefSeq (mRNA)	NM_138459	NM_030250
RefSeq (protein)	NP_612468	NP_084526
Location (UCSC)	Chr 6: 117.68 – 117.71 Mb	Chr 10: 52.29 – 52.32 Mb
PubMed search
- Wikidata
View/Edit Human	View/Edit Mouse

Nuclear undecaprenyl pyrophosphate synthase 1 homolog (NUS1), or dehydrodolichyl diphosphate synthase complex subunit NUS1, or Nogo-B receptor (NgBR) is a protein that in humans is encoded by the NUS1 gene. Mutations within the NUS1 gene lead to a diagnosis of an NUS1 genetic disorder.

== Gene ==
In humans NUS1 is located on is a chromosome 6q22.1.

== Clinical significance ==
If both copies of the NUS1 gene bear a mutation, the severe and rare disorder NUS1-CDG can occur. However, most patients only present with a mutation on one copy of the gene; this nevertheless causes a progressive neurological condition. Mutations of the NUS1 gene are associated with epilepsy, intellectual disability, and mild cerebellar ataxia.

NUS1 has been identified as a potential candidate gene for Parkinson's disease in Han Chinese people.
