= Missing heritability problem =

Unresolved discrepancy in genetics

In genetics, the missing heritability problem refers to a difference between heritability estimates obtained from early genome-wide association studies (GWAS) and heritability estimates from twin and family data across many physical and mental traits, including diseases, behaviors, and other phenotypes.

An influential review article in 2008 noted that the amount of phenotypic variance explained by significant loci in GWAS studies up to that point was usually far less than expected based on family studies. This gap was referred to as "missing heritability".

== Discovery ==
The missing heritability problem was named as such in 2008. The Human Genome Project led to optimistic forecasts that the large genetic contributions to many traits and diseases (which were identified by quantitative genetics and behavioral genetics in particular) would soon be mapped and pinned down to specific genes and their genetic variants by methods such as candidate-gene studies which used small samples with limited genetic sequencing to focus on specific genes believed to be involved, examining single-nucleotide polymorphisms (SNPs). While many hits were found, they often failed to replicate in other studies. The exponential fall in genome genotyping costs led to the use of genome-wide association studies (GWASes) which could simultaneously examine all candidate-genes in larger samples than the earlier candidate-gene studies. For the first time these produced replicatable signals; however by 2008 investigators were surprised to find that the detected signals could only explain a small fraction of the expected genetic variance.

== Dilemma ==
Standard genetics methods have long estimated large heritabilities such as 80% for traits such as height or intelligence, yet none of the genes had been found despite sample sizes that, while small, should have been able to detect variants of reasonable effect size such as 1 inch or 5 IQ points. If genes have such strong cumulative effects - where were they? Several resolutions have been proposed, that the missing heritability is some combination of:

1. Twin studies and other methods were grossly biased by issues long raised by their critics; there was little genetic influence to be found. Therefore, it has been proposed that the genes that supposedly underlie behavior genetic estimates of heritability simply do not exist. For instance, twin studies may have neglected to measure cross-cultural environmental variation by design.
2. Genetic effects are actually epigenetics
3. Genetic effects are generally non-additive and due to complex interactions. Among many proposals, a model has been introduced that takes into account epigenetic inheritance on the risk and recurrence risk of a complex disease. The limiting pathway (LP) model has been introduced in which a trait depends on the value of k inputs that can have rate limitations due to stoichiometric ratios, reactants required in a biochemical pathway, or proteins required for transcription of a gene. Each of these k inputs is a strictly additive trait that depends on a set of common or rare variants. When k = 1, the LP model is simply a standard additive trait.
4. Genetic effects are not due to the common SNPs examined in the candidate-gene studies & GWASes, but due to very rare mutations, copy-number variations, and other exotic kinds of genetic variants. These variants tend to be harmful and kept at low frequencies by natural selection. Whole-genome sequencing would be required to track down specific rare variants.
5. Traits are all misdiagnoses: one person's 'schizophrenia' is due to entirely different causes than another schizophrenic, and so while there may be a gene involved in one case, it will not be involved in another, rendering GWASes futile
6. GWASes are unable to detect genes with moderate effects on phenotypes when those genes segregate at high frequencies
7. Traits are genuine but inconsistently diagnosed or genetically influenced from country to country and time to time, leading to measurement error, which combined with genetic heterogeneity, either due to race or environment, will bias meta-analyzed GWAS & GCTA results towards zero,
8. Genetic effects are indeed through common SNPs acting additively, but are highly polygenic: dispersed over hundreds or thousands of variants each of small effect like a fraction of an inch or a fifth of an IQ point and with low prior probability: unexpected enough that a candidate-gene study is unlikely to select the right SNP out of hundreds of thousands of known SNPs, and GWASes up to 2010, with n<20000, would be unable to find hits which reach genome-wide statistical-significance thresholds. Much larger GWAS sample sizes, often n>100k, would be required to find any hits at all, and would steadily increase after that. Using height as a model trait, a paper in 2010 showed that most of the missing heritability can be explained by the presence of large numbers of low variants whose effect sizes were too small to detect at the sample sizes that were then available. This conclusion has subsequently been confirmed using much larger sample sizes, including a study of 5.4 million individuals that identified around 12,000 independent variants that affect human height. While studies of height have particularly large power due to their very large sample size, other complex traits likely have similar genetic architecture. Thus, the missing heritability problem is largely resolved by the presence of tens of thousands of variants of small effects that could not be detected in early GWAS studies.

This resolution to the missing heritability problem was supported by the introduction of Genome-wide complex trait analysis (GCTA) in 2010, which demonstrated that trait similarity could be predicted by the genetic similarity of unrelated strangers on common SNPs treated additively, and for many traits the SNP heritability was indeed a substantial fraction of the overall heritability. The GCTA results were further supported by findings that a small percent of trait variance could be predicted in GWASes without any genome-wide statistically-significant hits by a linear model including all SNPs regardless of p-value; if there were no SNP contribution, this would be unlikely, but it would be what one expected from SNPs whose effects were very imprecisely estimated by a too-small sample. Combined with the upper bound on maximum effect sizes set by the GWASes up to then, this strongly implied that the highly polygenic theory was correct. Examples of complex traits where increasingly large-scale GWASes have yielded the initial hits and then increasing numbers of hits as sample sizes increased from n<20k to n>100k or n>300k include height, educational attainment, and schizophrenia.
