= GWAS catalog =

Online database of genome-wide association study results

The GWAS Catalog is a free online database that compiles data of genome-wide association studies (GWAS), summarizing unstructured data from different literature sources into accessible high quality data. It is one of the most widely used public resources for GWAS research. It was created by the National Human Genome Research Institute (NHGRI) in 2008 and has become a collaborative project between the NHGRI and the European Bioinformatics Institute (EBI) since 2010. As of 2025, the GWAS Catalog contains over 7,400 curated publications and more than 1,040,000 reported SNP-trait associations. The GWAS Catalog also hosts tens of thousands of full genome-wide summary-statistics datasets, available for download for re-analysis and meta-analysis.

A GWAS identifies genetic loci associated with common traits and disease through the analysis of categorized variants across the genome and the catalog provides information from all published GWAS results that meet its criteria. The catalog contains publication information, study groups information (origin, size) and SNP-disease association information (including SNP identifier, P-value, gene and risk allele). Over the years, the GWAS Catalog has enhanced its data release frequency by adding features such as graphical user interface and ontology-supported search functionality.

The GWAS Catalog is widely used to identify causal variants and understand disease mechanisms by biologists, bioinformaticians and other researchers. GWAS have identified genomic loci associated with diseases such as cardiovascular disease, inflammatory bowel disease, type 2 diabetes and breast cancer.

== Applications ==
Some current applications of the GWAS Catalog include the use of studies on the genetics of human diseases and the heritability of human traits. The GWAS Catalog data can also be used as a pool of markers for SNP studies.
