= Genetic architecture =

Underlying genetic basis of a phenotypic trait and its variational properties

Genetic architecture refers to the underlying genetic basis of a phenotypic trait and its variational properties. Phenotypic variation for quantitative traits is, at the most basic level, the result of the segregation of alleles at quantitative trait loci (QTL). Environmental factors and other external influences can also play a role in phenotypic variation. Genetic architecture is a broad term that can be described for any given individual based on information regarding gene and allele number, the distribution of allelic and mutational effects, and patterns of pleiotropy, dominance, and epistasis.

There are several different experimental views of genetic architecture. Some researchers recognize that the interplay of various genetic mechanisms is incredibly complex, but believe that these mechanisms can be averaged and treated, more or less, like statistical noise. Other researchers claim that each and every gene interaction is significant and that it is necessary to measure and model these individual systemic influences on evolutionary genetics.

== Applications ==
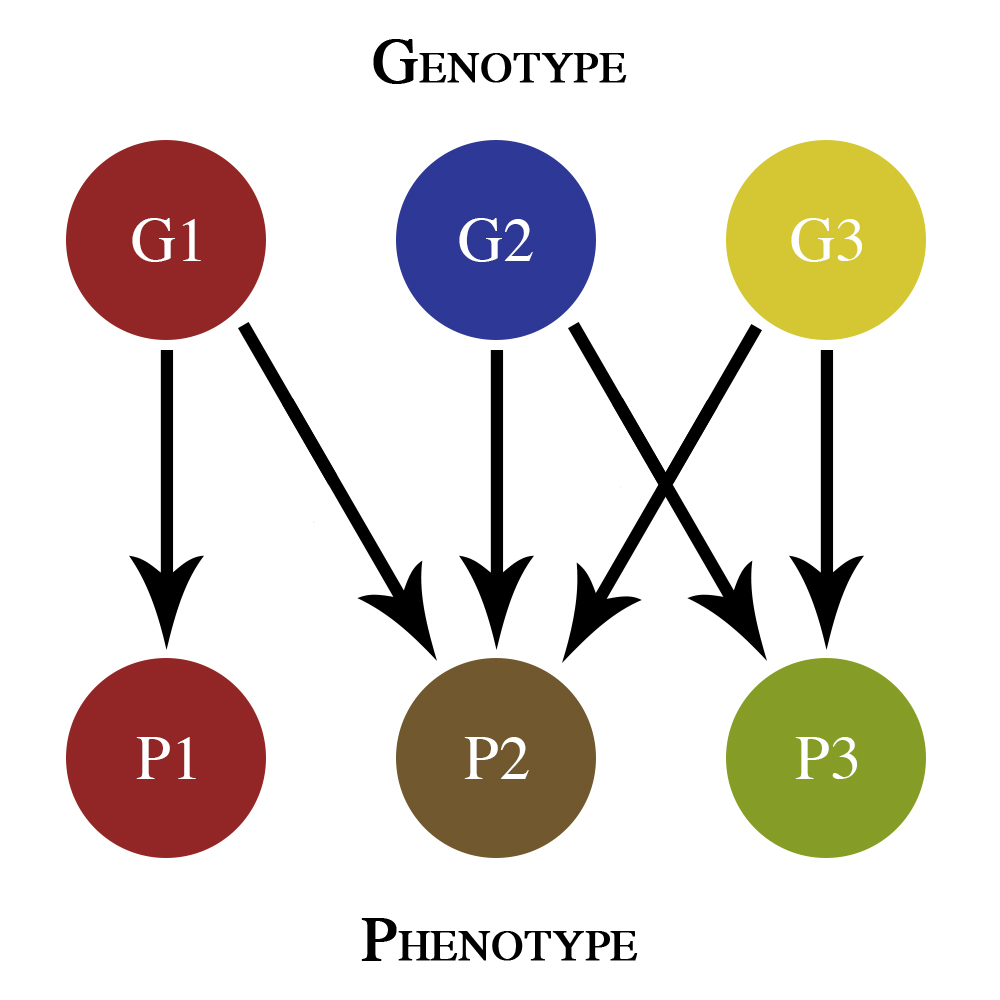
A very simple genotype–phenotype map that only shows additive pleiotropy effects

Genetic architecture can be studied and applied at many different levels. At the most basic, individual level, genetic architecture describes the genetic basis for differences between individuals, species, and populations. This can include, among other details, how many genes are involved in a specific phenotype and how gene interactions, such as epistasis, influence that phenotype. Line-cross analyses and QTL analyses can be used to study these differences. This is perhaps the most common way that genetic architecture is studied, and though it is useful for supplying pieces of information, it does not generally provide a complete picture of the genetic architecture as a whole.

Genetic architecture can also be used to discuss the evolution of populations. Classical quantitative genetics models, such as that developed by R.A. Fisher, are based on analyses of phenotype in terms of the contributions from different genes and their interactions. Genetic architecture is sometimes studied using a genotype–phenotype map, which graphically depicts the relationship between the genotype and the phenotype.

Genetic architecture is important for understanding evolutionary theory because it describes phenotypic variation in its underlying genetic terms, and thus it gives us clues about the evolutionary potential of these variations. Therefore, genetic architecture can help us to answer biological questions about speciation, the evolution of sex and recombination, the survival of small populations, inbreeding, understanding diseases, animal and plant breeding, and more.

== Evolvability ==
Evolvability is literally defined as the ability to evolve. In terms of genetics, evolvability is the ability of a genetic system to produce and maintain potentially adaptive genetic variants. There are several aspects of genetic architecture that contribute strongly to the evolvability of a system, including autonomy, mutability, coordination, epistasis, pleiotropy, polygeny, and robustness.

- Autonomy: the existence of quasi-independent characters with the potential for evolutionary autonomy.
- Mutability: the possibility that genetic mutation can occur.
- Coordination: a phenomenon such as development, during which many different genetic processes and changes happen at once.
- Epistasis: a phenomenon in which one gene is dependent on the presence of one or more "modifier" genes.
- Polygeny: a phenomenon in which multiple genes contribute to a particular phenotypic character.
- Pleiotropy: a phenomenon in which a single gene affects one or more phenotypic characteristics.
- Robustness: the ability of a phenotype to remain constant in spite of genetic mutation.

== Examples ==
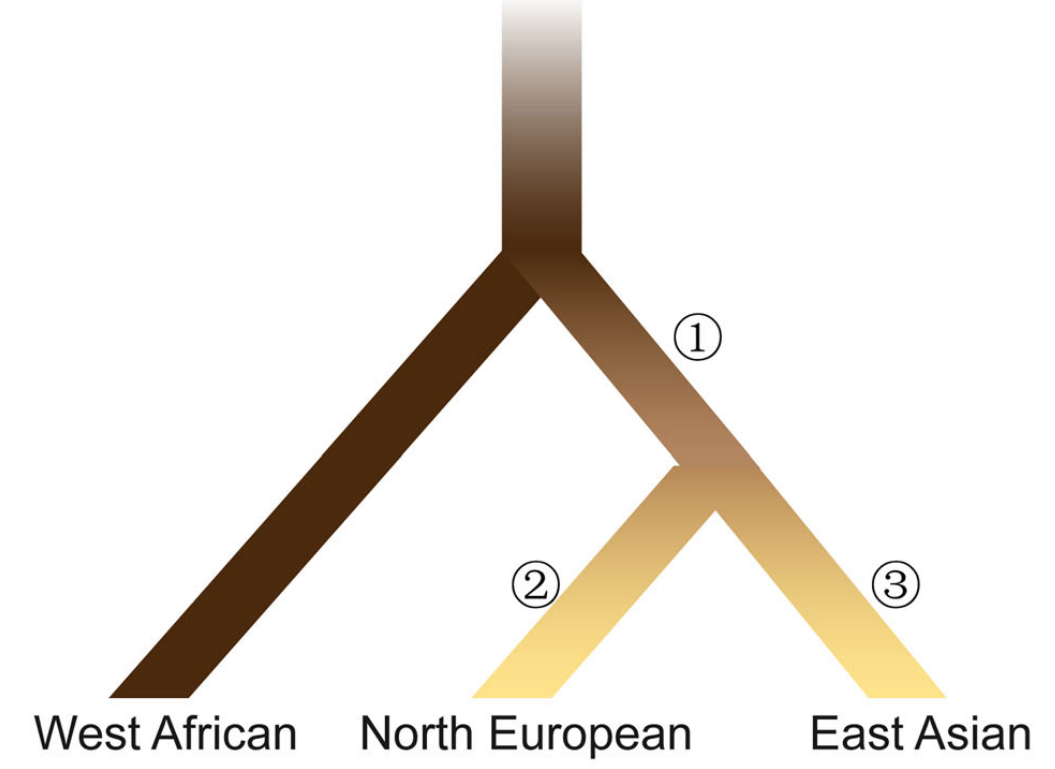
A speculative framework for the evolutionary history underlying current-day phenotypic variation in human skin pigmentation based on the similarities and differences found in various genotypes

A study published in 2006 used phylogeny to compare the genetic architecture of differing human skin color. In this study, researchers were able to suggest a speculative framework for the evolutionary history underlying current-day phenotypic variation in human skin pigmentation based on the similarities and differences they found in the genotype. Evolutionary history is an important consideration in understanding the genetic basis of any trait, and this study was among the first to utilize these concepts in a paired fashion to determine information about the underlying genetics of a phenotypic trait.

In 2013, a group of researchers used genome-wide association studies (GWAS) and genome-wide interaction studies (GWIS) to determine the risk of congenital heart defects in patients with Down syndrome. Down Syndrome is a genetic disorder caused by trisomy of human chromosome 21. The current hypothesis regarding congenital heart defect phenotypes in Down Syndrome individuals is that three copies of functional genomic elements on chromosome 21 and genetic variation of chromosome 21 and non-chromosome 21 loci predispose patients to abnormal heart development. This study identified several congenital heart defect risk loci in Down Syndrome individuals, as well as three copy number variation (CNV) regions that may contribute to congenital heart defects in Down Syndrome individuals.

Another study, which was published in 2014, sought to identify the genetic architecture of psychiatric disorders. The researchers in this study suggested that there are a large number of contributing loci that are related to various psychiatric disorders. Additionally, they, like many others, suggested that the genetic risk of psychiatric disorders involves the combined effects of many common variants with small effects - in other words, the small effects of a wide number of variants at specific loci add together to produce a large, combined effect on the overall phenotype of the individual. They also acknowledged the presence of large but rare mutations that have a large effect on phenotype. This study showcases the intricacy of genetic architecture by providing an example of many different SNPs and mutations working together, each with a varying effect, to generate a given phenotype.

Other studies regarding genetic architecture are many and varied, but most use similar types of analyses to provide specific information regarding loci involved in producing a phenotype. A study of the human immune system in 2015 uses the same general concepts to identify several loci involved in the development of the immune system, but, like the other studies outlined here, failed to consider other aspects of genetic architecture, such as environmental influences. Unfortunately, many other aspects of genetic architecture remain difficult to quantify.

Although there are a few studies that seek to explore the other aspects of genetic architecture, there is little ability with current technologies to link all of the pieces together to build a truly comprehensive model of genetic architecture. For example, in 2003, a study of genetic architecture and the environment was able to show an association of social environment with variation in body size in Drosophila melanogaster. However, this study was not able to tie a direct link to specific genes involved in this variation.

== See also ==
- Ambidirectional dominance
