= Pleiotropy =

Influence of a single gene on multiple phenotypic traits

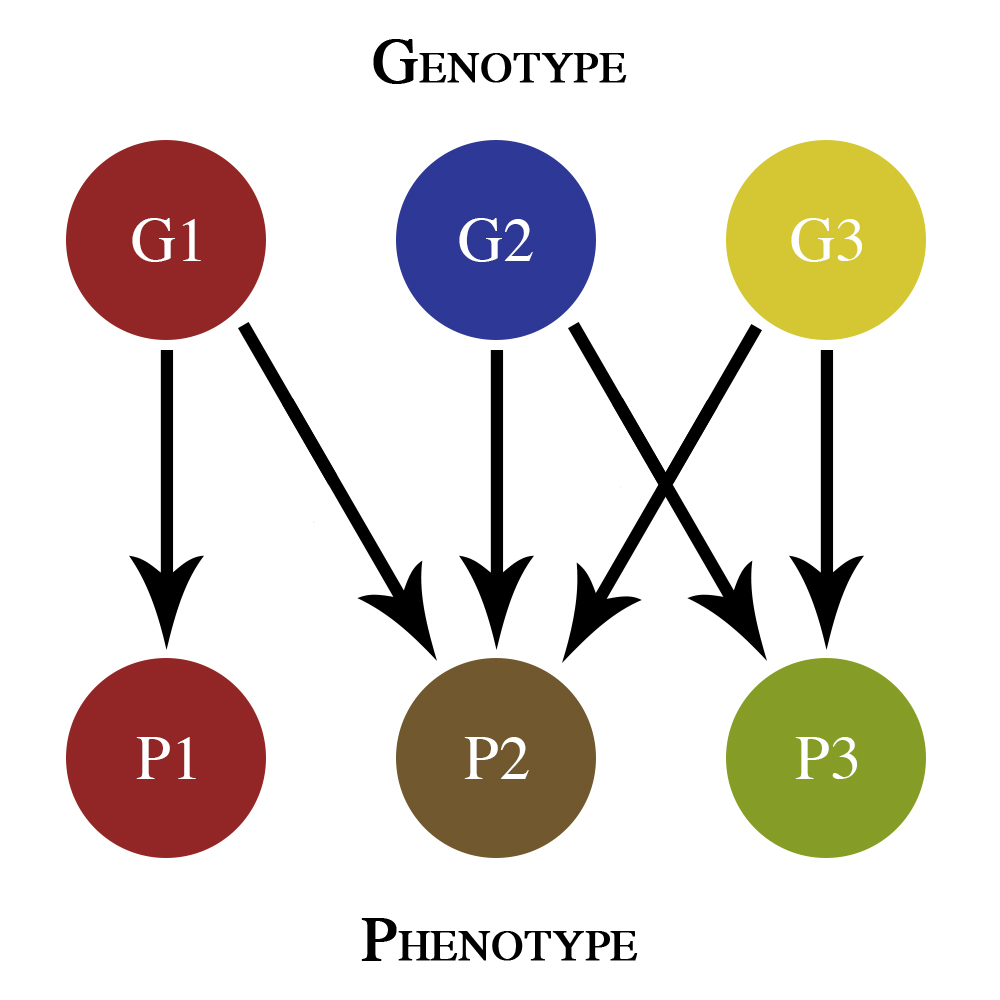
Simple genotype–phenotype map that only shows additive pleiotropy effects. G1, G2, and G3 are different genes that contribute to phenotypic traits P1, P2, and P3.

Pleiotropy (from Ancient Greek πλείων (pleíōn) 'more' and τρόπος (trópos) 'turn, way, manner, style') is a condition in which a single gene or genetic variant influences multiple phenotypic traits. A gene that has such multiple effects is referred to as a pleiotropic gene. Mutations in pleiotropic genes can affect several traits simultaneously, often because the gene product is used in various cells and affects different biological targets through shared signaling pathways.

Pleiotropy can result from several distinct but potentially overlapping mechanisms, including gene pleiotropy, developmental pleiotropy, and selectional pleiotropy. Gene pleiotropy occurs when a gene product interacts with multiple proteins or catalyzes different reactions. Developmental pleiotropy refers to mutations that produce several phenotypic effects during development. Selectional pleiotropy occurs when a single phenotype influences evolutionary fitness in multiple ways (depending on factors such as age and sex).

There are also three main types of genetic pleiotropic effects when a variant or gene is associated with more than one trait:

- Biological pleiotropy, where a genetic variant directly affects multiple traits through biological pathways.
- Mediated pleiotropy, where a variant influences one trait, which in turn causes changes in a second trait, and
- Spurious pleiotropy, where statistical or methodological biases make it falsely appear as though a variant is associated with multiple traits.

A well-known example of pleiotropy is phenylketonuria (PKU), a genetic disorder caused by a mutation in a single gene on chromosome 12 that encodes the enzyme phenylalanine hydroxylase. This mutation leads to the accumulation of the amino acid phenylalanine in the body, affecting multiple systems, such as the nervous and integumentary system.

Pleiotropic gene action can limit the rate of multivariate evolution when natural selection, sexual selection or artificial selection on one trait favors one allele, while selection on other traits favors a different allele. Pleiotropic mutations can sometimes be deleterious, especially when they negatively affect essential traits. Genetic correlations and responses to selection most often exemplify pleiotropy.

Pleiotropy is widespread in the genome, with many genes influencing biological traits and pathways. Understanding pleiotropy is crucial in genome-wide association studies (GWAS), where variants are often linked to multiple traits or diseases.

== History ==
Pleiotropic traits had been previously recognized in the scientific community but had not been experimented on until Gregor Mendel's 1866 pea plant experiment. Mendel recognized that certain pea plant traits (seed coat color, flower color, and axial spots) seemed to be inherited together; however, their correlation to a single gene has never been proven.

The term "pleiotropie" was first coined by Ludwig Plate in his Festschrift, which was published in 1910. He originally defined pleiotropy as occurring when "several characteristics are dependent upon ... [inheritance]; these characteristics will then always appear together and may thus appear correlated". This definition is still used today.

After Plate's definition, Hans Gruneberg was the first to study the mechanisms of pleiotropy. In 1938 Gruneberg published an article dividing pleiotropy into two distinct types: "genuine" and "spurious" pleiotropy. "Genuine" pleiotropy is when two distinct primary products arise from one locus. "Spurious" pleiotropy, on the other hand, is either when one primary product is utilized in different ways or when one primary product initiates a cascade of events with different phenotypic consequences. Gruneberg came to these distinctions after experimenting on rats with skeletal mutations. He recognized that "spurious" pleiotropy was present in the mutation, while "genuine" pleiotropy was not, thus partially invalidating his own original theory. Through subsequent research, it has been established that Gruneberg's definition of "spurious" pleiotropy is what we now identify simply as "pleiotropy".

In 1941 American geneticists George Beadle and Edward Tatum further invalidated Gruneberg's definition of "genuine" pleiotropy, advocating instead for the "one gene–one enzyme" hypothesis that was originally introduced by French biologist Lucien Cuénot in 1903. This hypothesis shifted future research regarding pleiotropy towards how a single gene can produce various phenotypes.

In the mid-1950s Richard Goldschmidt and Ernst Hadorn, through separate individual research, reinforced the faultiness of "genuine" pleiotropy. A few years later, Hadorn partitioned pleiotropy into a "mosaic" model (which states that one locus directly affects two phenotypic traits) and a "relational" model (which is analogous to "spurious" pleiotropy). These terms are no longer in use but have contributed to the current understanding of pleiotropy.

By accepting the one gene–one enzyme hypothesis, scientists instead focused on how uncoupled phenotypic traits can be affected by genetic recombination and mutations, applying it to populations and evolution. This view of pleiotropy, "universal pleiotropy", defined as locus mutations being capable of affecting essentially all traits, was first implied by Ronald Fisher's Geometric Model in 1930. This mathematical model illustrates how evolutionary fitness depends on the independence of phenotypic variation from random changes (that is, mutations). It theorizes that an increasing phenotypic independence corresponds to a decrease in the likelihood that a given mutation will result in an increase in fitness.

Expanding on Fisher's work, Sewall Wright provided more evidence in his 1968 book Evolution and the Genetics of Populations: Genetic and Biometric Foundations by using molecular genetics to support the idea of "universal pleiotropy". The concepts of these various studies on evolution have seeded numerous other research projects relating to individual fitness.

In 1957 evolutionary biologist George C. Williams theorized that antagonistic effects will be exhibited during an organism's life cycle if it is closely linked and pleiotropic. Natural selection favors genes that are more beneficial prior to reproduction than after (leading to an increase in reproductive success). Knowing this, Williams argued that if only close linkage was present, then beneficial traits will occur both before and after reproduction due to natural selection. This, however, is not observed in nature, and thus antagonistic pleiotropy contributes to the slow deterioration with age (senescence).

== Mechanism ==
Pleiotropy describes the genetic effect of a single gene on multiple phenotypic traits. Recent genetic research distinguishes between three forms of pleiotropy:

=== Biological pleiotropy ===
Biological pleiotropy also known as horizontal pleiotropy is when a causal variant or gene has direct and independent effects on more than one phenotypes. There are two sub-types of biological pleiotropy, single-gene pleiotropy and multigene regulatory pleiotropy.

==== Single-gene pleiotropy ====
Causal risk variants can affect several traits by acting on a single gene that has many different effects. There are several ways that this kind of gene pleiotropy can happen, and these possibilities can overlap. For example, a gene might have more than one molecular function, be involved in several separate biological pathways or cellular processes, or be active in different organs, tissues, or times and places in the body, each influencing different traits. Also, one gene can produce different versions of a protein, called isoforms, which vary in structure and function and contribute to the gene's wide range of effects.

==== Multigene regulatory pleiotropy ====
Pleiotropy also occurs when a causal variant changes the expression of many genes. Every one of these genes may play a role in shaping different phenotypic outcomes. Regulatory pleiotropy can also arise from genetic influences on the 3D structure of chromosomes.

=== Mediated pleiotropy ===
Also known as vertical pleiotropy and happens when a causal variant effect on one trait which itself causes effect on a different trait. An example of mediated pleiotropy is that gene variants that affect low-density lipoprotein (LDF) also affect coronary artery disease.

=== Spurious pleiotropy ===
Sometimes, what looks like pleiotropy can be caused by problems in how the study is designed or how risk genes and traits are defined, leading to incorrect conclusions about pleiotropy. Spurious pleiotropy occurs when there is a misclassification either at the genomic level or the phenotypic level. At the genomic level, this might happen when a region of the genome linked to a special trait includes causal variants that are related. When this is the case, variants that influence different phenotypes through separate biological mechanisms may wrongly appear as a single pleiotropic locus.

=== Other ===
==== Polygenicity-induced horizontal pleiotropy ====
There has been introduced a fourth type, polygenicity-induced horizontal pleiotropy, where several genetic loci with causal effects could be linked to multiple phenotypic traits.

==== Network pleiotropy ====
Another model that has been proposed is network pleiotropy. In this model, a single causal variant influences several traits through one or more intermediate cell types within the same network. It may be especially useful for explaining multi-dimensional psychiatric disorders such as schizophrenia and bipolar disorder.

== Polygenic risk scores and pleiotropy in complex traits ==
One of the key challenges is to figure out if a gene actually influences more than one trait. One reason is that it's not always clear how traits should be grouped or named when studying them. Another challenge is that many of the methods used to test for pleiotropy, do it in an indirect way. Usually, these methods start by assuming that a gene doesn't affect any traits, and then look for evidence to prove otherwise. To solve this, researchers have developed better ways to test if a gene affects several traits at the same time, using methods that don't rely on these indirect assumptions.

Early genome-wide association studies (GWAS) that revealed links between many genetic loci and multiple traits were often described in terms of cross-phenotype (CP) associations. When such associations can be traced back to a shared biological mechanism at the causal locus, they can be more precisely defined as pleiotropic effects.

Genome-wide association studies and machine learning analysis of large-scale genomic data have made it possible to develop SNP-based polygenic predictors for complex human traits. The goal of GWAS was to identify how strongly a specific genetic variant, typically a single-nucleotide polymorphism (SNP), is associated with a particular human trait.

One way to quantify pleiotropy is by measuring the proportion of shared genetic variance between two complex traits. Analyses of hundreds of trait pairs have shown that often, the genomic regions involved are largely distinct, with only modest overlap. This suggests that, for the complex traits studied so far, pleiotropy is generally limited. Still, identifying genetic variants through GWAS and linking them to biological pathways offers valuable opportunities to improve diagnosis, develop new therapies, and better prevent diseases.

Polygenic risk scores (PRS), built from these findings, holds promise for predicting individual risk for various conditions. However, while PRS has many strengths, their predictive power remains probabalistic. The accuracy and reliability of these scores are currently under scrutiny, emphasizing the need for cautious interpretation when applying them to clinical or public health contexts.

== Models for the origin ==
One basic model of pleiotropy's origin describes a single gene locus that influences one trait. At first, this gene only affects the trait by changing how other genes are expressed. Over time, that locus would affect two traits by interacting with a second locus. If both traits are favored by natural selection at the same time, the connection between them becomes stronger. But, if only one trait is selected for, the connection weakens. Eventually, traits that underwent directional selection simultaneously were linked by a single gene, resulting in pleiotropy.

The "pleiotropy-barrier" model proposes a logistic growth pattern for the increase of pleiotropy over time. This model differentiates between the levels of pleiotropy in evolutionarily younger and older genes subjected to natural selection. It suggests a higher potential for phenotypic innovation in evolutionarily newer genes due to their lower levels of pleiotropy.

Other more complex models compensate for some of the basic model's oversights, such as multiple traits or assumptions about how the loci affect the traits. They also propose the idea that pleiotropy increases the phenotypic variation of both traits since a single mutation on a gene would have twice the effect.

== Evolution ==
Pleiotropy can have an effect on the evolutionary rate of genes and allele frequencies. Traditionally, models of pleiotropy have predicted that evolutionary rate of genes is related negatively with pleiotropy – as the number of traits of an organism increases, the evolutionary rates of genes in the organism's population decrease. This relationship has not been clearly found in empirical studies for a long time. However, a study based on human disease genes revealed the evidence of lower evolutionary rate in genes with higher pleiotropy.

In mating, for many animals the signals and receptors of sexual communication may have evolved simultaneously as the expression of a single gene, instead of the result of selection on two independent genes, one that affects the signaling trait and one that affects the receptor trait. In such a case, pleiotropy would facilitate mating and survival. However, pleiotropy can act negatively as well. A study on seed beetles found that intralocus sexual conflict arises when selection for certain alleles of a gene that are beneficial for one sex causes expression of potentially harmful traits by the same gene in the other sex, especially if the gene is located on an autosomal chromosome.

Pleiotropic genes act as an arbitrating force in speciation. William R. Rice and Ellen E. Hostert (1993) conclude that the observed prezygotic isolation in their studies is a product of pleiotropy's balancing role in indirect selection. By imitating the traits of all-infertile hybridized species, they noticed that the fertilization of eggs was prevented in all eight of their separate studies, a likely effect of pleiotropic genes on speciation. Likewise, pleiotropic gene's stabilizing selection allows for the allele frequency to be altered.

Studies on fungal evolutionary genomics have shown pleiotropic traits that simultaneously affect adaptation and reproductive isolation, converting adaptations directly to speciation. A particularly telling case of this effect is host specificity in pathogenic ascomycetes and specifically, in venturia, the fungus responsible for apple scab. These parasitic fungi each adapts to a host, and are only able to mate within a shared host after obtaining resources. Since a single toxin gene or virulence allele can grant the ability to colonize the host, adaptation and reproductive isolation are instantly facilitated, and in turn, pleiotropically causes adaptive speciation. The studies on fungal evolutionary genomics will further elucidate the earliest stages of divergence as a result of gene flow, and provide insight into pleiotropically induced adaptive divergence in other eukaryotes.

=== Antagonistic pleiotropy ===
Sometimes, a pleiotropic gene may be both harmful and beneficial to an organism, which is referred to as antagonistic pleiotropy. This may occur when the trait is beneficial for the organism's early life, but not its late life. Such "trade-offs" are possible since natural selection affects traits expressed earlier in life, when most organisms are most fertile, more than traits expressed later in life.

This idea is central to the antagonistic pleiotropy hypothesis, which was first developed by G. C. Williams in 1957. Williams suggested that some genes responsible for increased fitness in the younger, fertile organism contribute to decreased fitness later in life, which may give an evolutionary explanation for senescence. An example is the p53 gene, which suppresses cancer but also suppresses stem cells, which replenish worn-out tissue.

Unfortunately, the process of antagonistic pleiotropy may result in an altered evolutionary path with delayed adaptation, in addition to effectively cutting the overall benefit of any alleles by roughly half. However, antagonistic pleiotropy also lends greater evolutionary "staying power" to genes controlling beneficial traits, since an organism with a mutation to those genes would have a decreased chance of successfully reproducing, as multiple traits would be affected, potentially for the worse.

Antagonistic pleiotropy can manifest in many ways, depending on the contexts in which its positive and negative effects occur. These effects may arise in different stages of an life. For example can certain alleles of ORL1 (lectin-like low-density lipoprotein receptor 1) enhance the immune defense in early life but also, increase the risk of cardiovascular disease later. It is also a possibility, that positive and negative effects can occur at the same time, for example some alleles of the androgen receptor (AR), which appears to lower the risk of getting breast cancer at the same time increasing the risk of ovarian cancer.

Sickle cell anemia is a classic example of the mixed benefit given by the staying power of pleiotropic genes, as the mutation to Hb-S provides the fitness benefit of malaria resistance to heterozygotes as sickle cell trait, while homozygotes have significantly lowered life expectancy—what is known as "heterozygote advantage". Since both of these states are linked to the same mutated gene, large populations today are susceptible to sickle cell despite it being a fitness-impairing genetic disorder.

== Examples ==
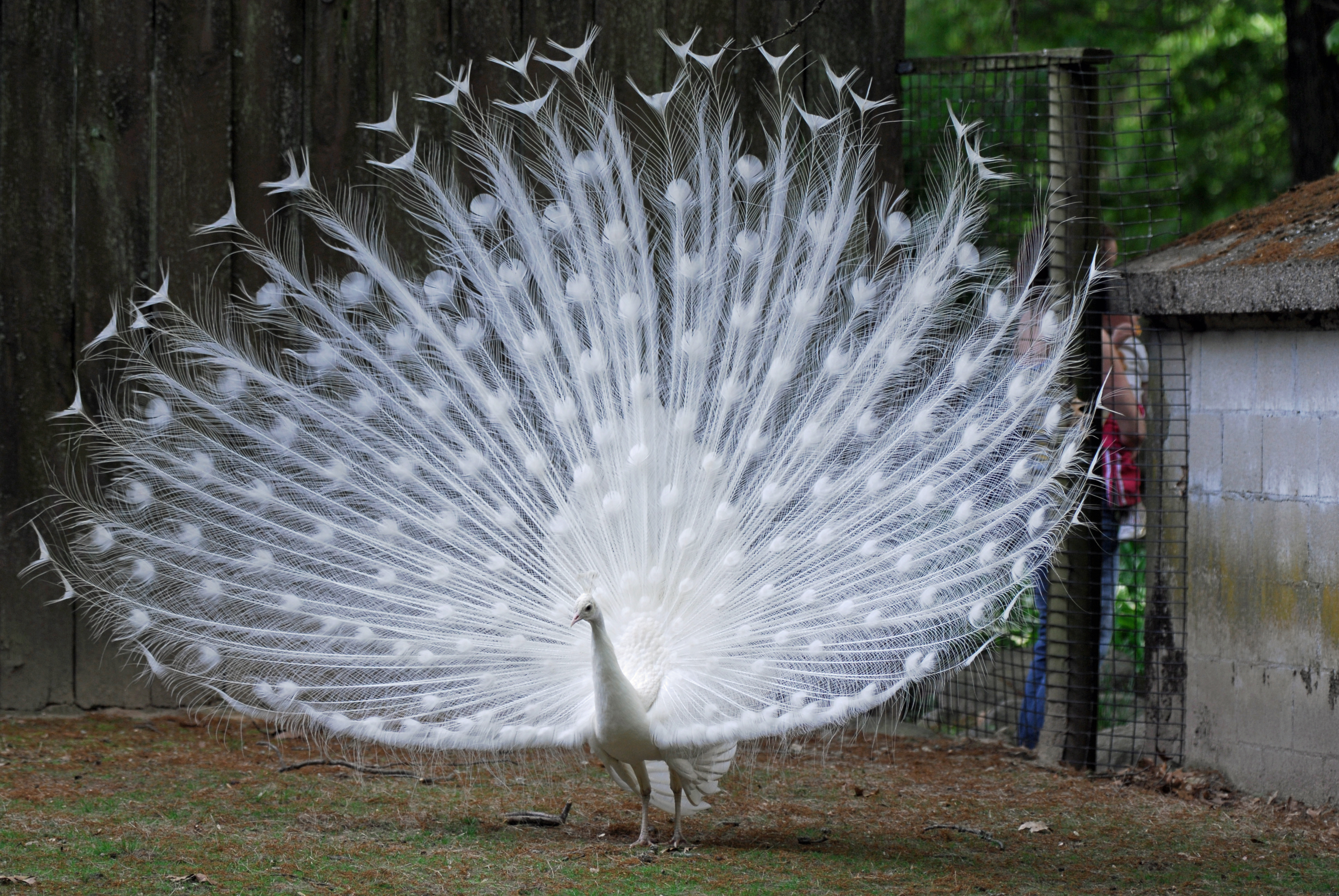
Peacock with albinism

=== Human ===
==== Albinism ====
Albinism is the mutation of the TYR gene, also termed tyrosinase. This mutation causes the most common form of albinism. The mutation alters the production of melanin, thereby affecting melanin-related and other dependent traits throughout the organism. Melanin is a substance made by the body that is used to absorb light and provides coloration to the skin. Indications of albinism are the absence of color in an organism's eyes, hair, and skin, due to the lack of melanin. Some forms of albinism are also known to have symptoms that manifest themselves through rapid eye movement, light sensitivity, and strabismus.

==== Phenylketonuria (PKU) ====
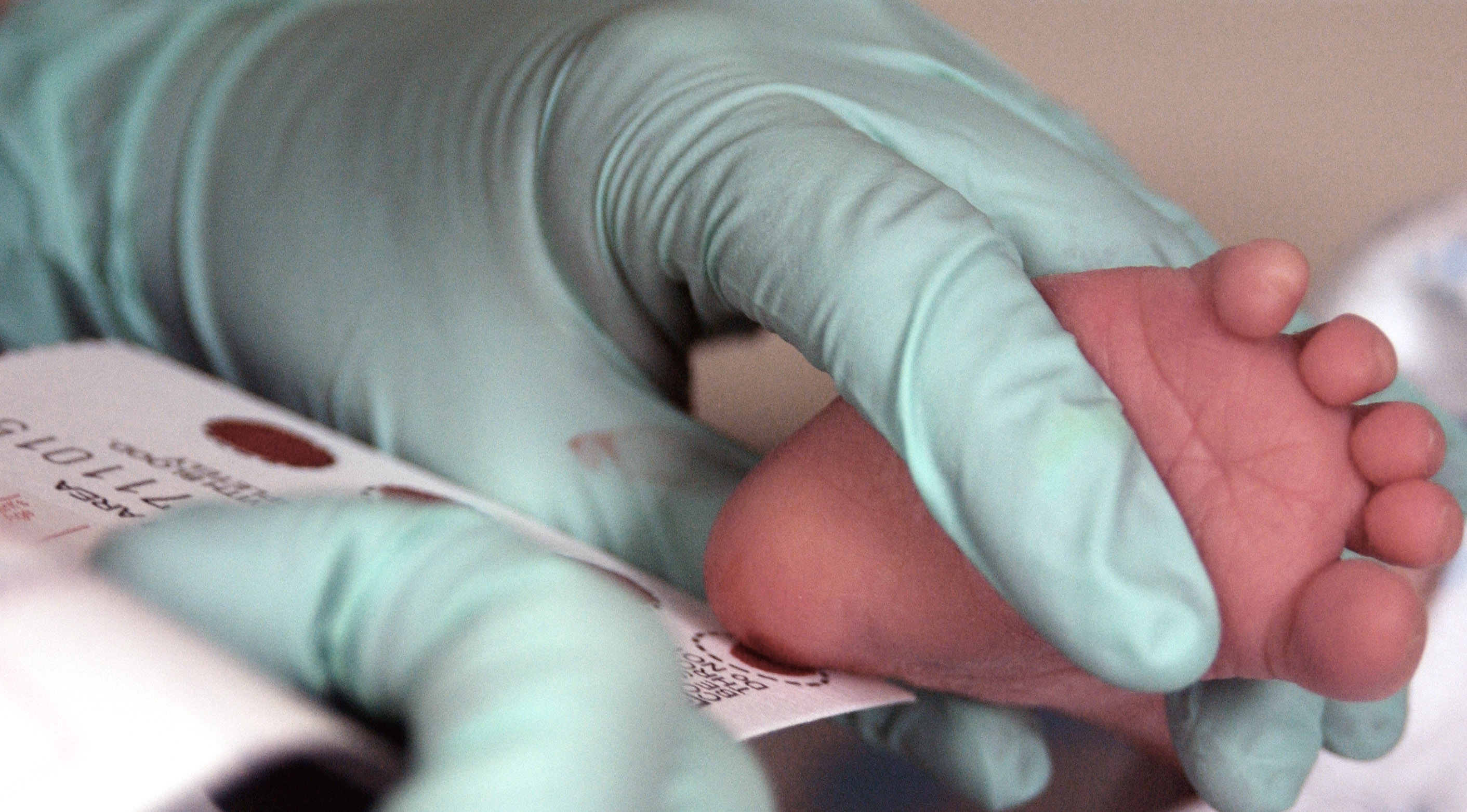
The blood of a two-week-old infant is collected for a PKU screening.

A common example of pleiotropy is the human disease phenylketonuria (PKU). This disease causes intellectual disability and reduced hair and skin pigmentation, and can be caused by any of a large number of mutations in the single gene on chromosome 12 that codes for the enzyme phenylalanine hydroxylase, which converts the amino acid phenylalanine to tyrosine. Depending on the mutation involved, this conversion is reduced or ceases entirely. Unconverted phenylalanine builds up in the bloodstream and can lead to levels that are toxic to the developing nervous system of newborn and infant children. The most dangerous form of this is called classic PKU, which is common in infants. The baby seems normal at first but actually incurs permanent intellectual disability. This can cause symptoms such as intellectual disability, abnormal gait and posture, and delayed growth. Because tyrosine is used by the body to make melanin (a component of the pigment found in the hair and skin), failure to convert normal levels of phenylalanine to tyrosine can lead to fair hair and skin. The frequency of this disease varies greatly. Specifically, in the United States, PKU is found at a rate of nearly 1 in 10,000 births. Due to newborn screening, doctors are able to detect PKU in a baby sooner. This allows them to start treatment early, preventing the baby from suffering from the severe effects of PKU. PKU is caused by a mutation in the PAH gene, whose role is to instruct the body on how to make phenylalanine hydroxylase. Phenylalanine hydroxylase is what converts the phenylalanine, taken in through diet, into other things that the body can use. The mutation often decreases the effectiveness or rate at which the hydroxylase breaks down the phenylalanine. This is what causes the phenylalanine to build up in the body.

==== Sickle cell anemia ====
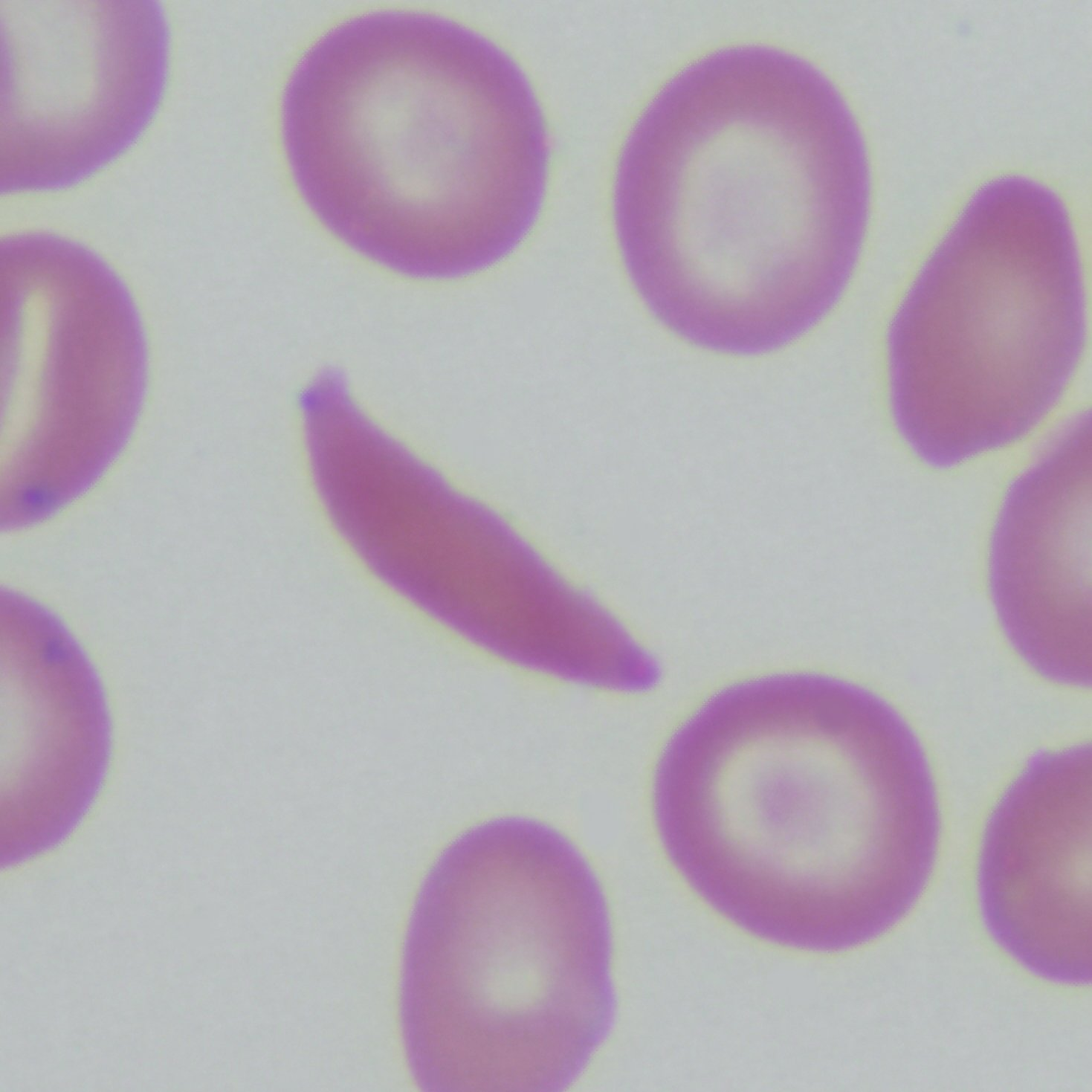
Photomicrograph of normal-shaped and sickle-shape red blood cells from a patient with sickle cell disease

Sickle cell anemia is a genetic disease that causes deformed red blood cells with a rigid, crescent shape instead of the normal flexible, round shape. It is caused by a change in one nucleotide, a point mutation in the HBB gene. The HBB gene encodes information to make the beta-globin subunit of hemoglobin, which is the protein red blood cells use to carry oxygen throughout the body. Sickle cell anemia occurs when the HBB gene mutation causes both beta-globin subunits of hemoglobin to change into hemoglobin S (HbS).

Sickle cell anemia is a pleiotropic disease because the expression of a single mutated HBB gene produces numerous consequences throughout the body. The mutated hemoglobin forms polymers and clumps together causing the deoxygenated sickle red blood cells to assume the disfigured sickle shape. As a result, the cells are inflexible and cannot easily flow through blood vessels, increasing the risk of blood clots and possibly depriving vital organs of oxygen. Some complications associated with sickle cell anemia include pain, damaged organs, strokes, high blood pressure, and loss of vision. Sickle red blood cells also have a shortened lifespan and die prematurely.

==== Marfan syndrome ====
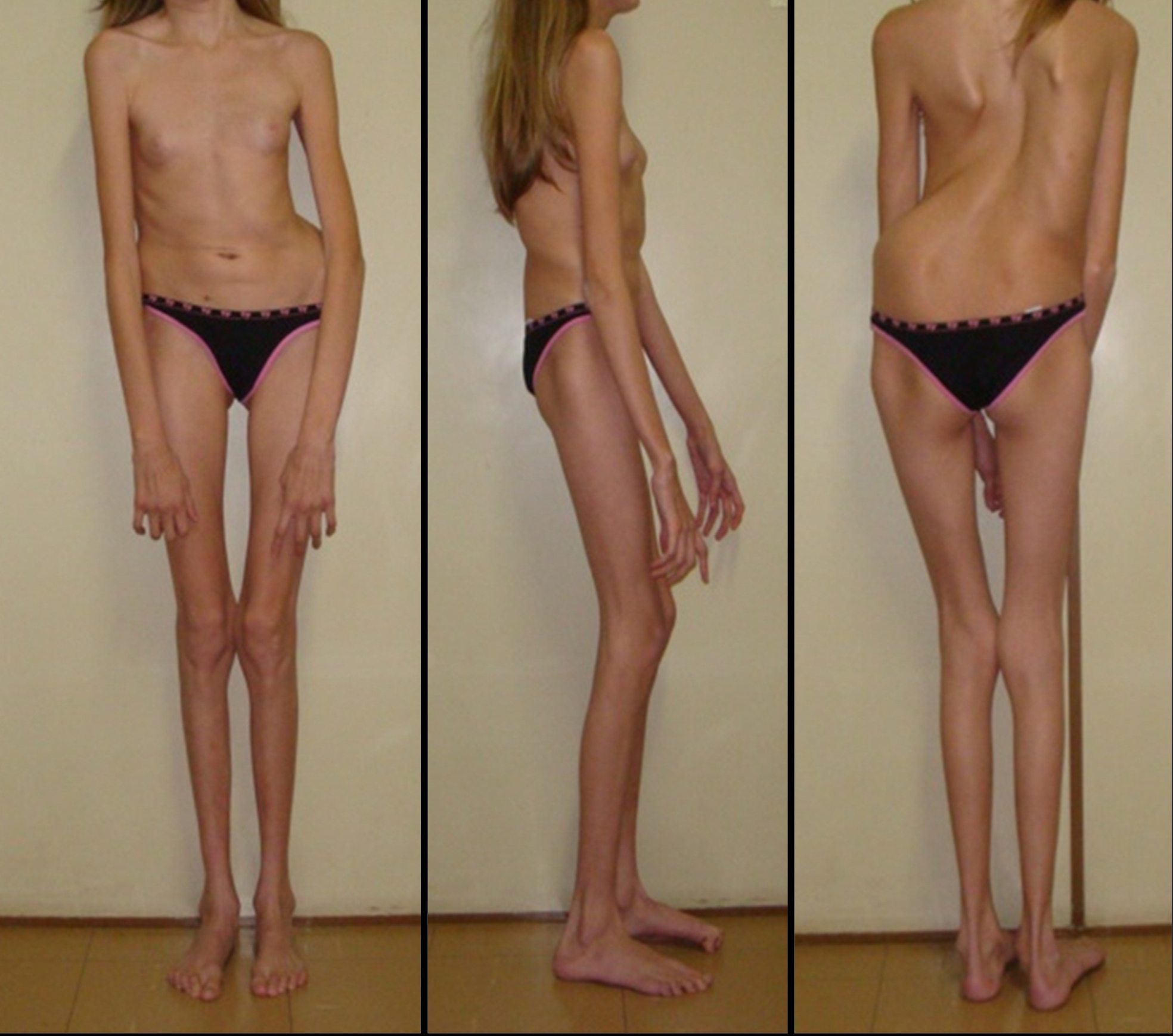
Patient with Marfan Syndrome

Marfan syndrome (MFS) is an autosomal dominant disorder which affects 1 in 5–10,000 people. MFS arises from a mutation in the FBN1 gene, which encodes for the glycoprotein fibrillin-1, a major constituent of extracellular microfibrils which form connective tissues. Over 1,000 different mutations in FBN1 have been found to result in abnormal function of fibrillin, which consequently relates to connective tissues elongating progressively and weakening. Because these fibers are found in tissues throughout the body, mutations in this gene can have a widespread effect on certain systems, including the skeletal, cardiovascular, and nervous system, as well as the eyes and lungs.

Without medical intervention, prognosis of Marfan syndrome can range from moderate to life-threatening, with 90% of known causes of death in diagnosed patients relating to cardiovascular complications and congestive cardiac failure. Other characteristics of MFS include an increased arm span and decreased upper to lower body ratio.

==== Pain susceptibility ====
In the context of pain, pleiotropy refers to the ability of a single gene or genomic region to influence multiple pain-related traits. A study that conducted a genome-wide association joint analysis of 17 pain-related traits revealed that many of the 99 identified risk loci are pleiotropic. This implies that, rather than these loci being associated with just one type of pain, many genetic loci contribute to susceptibility to various forms of pain, including headaches, muscle pain, and chronic pain.

These pleiotropic loci were classified into four groups: loci associated with nearly all pain traits, loci associated with a specific type of pain, loci associated with multiple forms of musculoskeletal pain, and loci associated with headaches.

Additionally, pleiotropy was not limited to different types of pain but also extended to psychiatric, metabolic, and immunological traits. Genetic correlations were found between pain susceptibility and conditions such as depression, increase of body mass index, asthma, and cardiovascular diseases.

=== Animals ===
==== Chickens ====
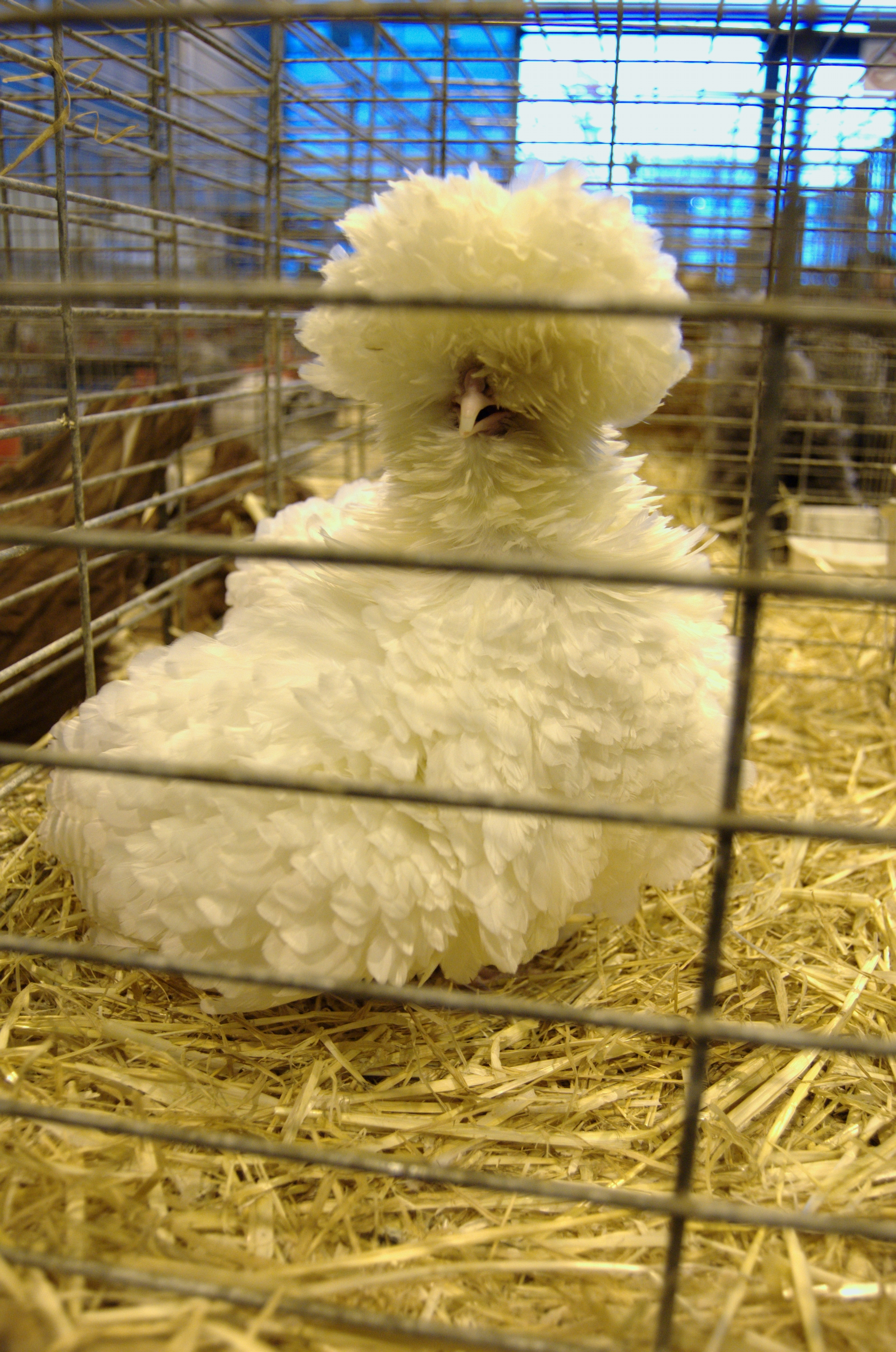
Chicken exhibiting the frizzle feather trait

Chickens exhibit various traits affected by pleiotropic genes. Some chickens exhibit frizzle feather trait, where their feathers all curl outward and upward rather than lying flat against the body. Frizzle feather was found to stem from a deletion in the genomic region coding for α-Keratin. This gene seems to pleiotropically lead to other abnormalities like increased metabolism, higher food consumption, accelerated heart rate, and delayed sexual maturity.

Domesticated chickens underwent a rapid selection process that led to unrelated phenotypes having high correlations, suggesting pleiotropic, or at least close linkage, effects between comb mass and physiological structures related to reproductive abilities. Both males and females with larger combs have higher bone density and strength, which allows females to deposit more calcium into eggshells. This linkage is further evidenced by the fact that two of the genes, HAO1 and BMP2, affecting medullary bone (the part of the bone that transfers calcium into developing eggshells) are located at the same locus as the gene affecting comb mass. HAO1 and BMP2 also display pleiotropic effects with commonly desired domestic chicken behavior; those chickens who express higher levels of these two genes in bone tissue produce more eggs and display less egg incubation behavior.

=== Pleiotropy in psychiatry ===
==== Autism and schizophrenia ====
Pleiotropy in genes has been linked between certain psychiatric disorders as well. Deletion in the 22q11.2 region of chromosome 22 has been associated with schizophrenia and autism. Schizophrenia and autism are linked to the same gene deletion but manifest very differently from each other. The resulting phenotype depends on the stage of life at which the individual develops the disorder. Childhood manifestation of the gene deletion is typically associated with autism, while adolescent and later expression of the gene deletion often manifests in schizophrenia or other psychotic disorders. Though the disorders are linked by genetics, there is no increased risk found for adult schizophrenia in patients who are autistic.

A 2013 study also genetically linked five psychiatric disorders, including schizophrenia and autism. The link was a single nucleotide polymorphism of two genes involved in calcium channel signaling with neurons. One of these genes, CACNA1C, has been found to influence cognition. It has been associated with autism, as well as linked in studies to schizophrenia and bipolar disorder. These particular studies show clustering of these diseases within patients themselves or families. The estimated heritability of schizophrenia is 70% to 90%, therefore the pleiotropy of genes is crucial since it causes an increased risk for certain psychotic disorders and can aid psychiatric diagnosis.

Through looping in three-dimensional space, distant non-coding regulatory elements, sometimes located several megabases away from gene promoters, can physically interact with and influence the expression of specific genes. For example, there is a genetic variant located upstream of the PCDH gene clusters that play a role in brain development and has been shown to impact the expression of several protocadherin genes. These genes have been linked to schizophrenia and major depressive disorder.

=== Model organisms ===
==== "Mini-muscle" allele ====
A gene recently discovered in laboratory house mice, termed "mini-muscle", causes, when mutated, a 50% reduction in hindlimb muscle mass as its primary effect (the phenotypic effect by which it was originally identified). In addition to smaller hindlimb muscle mass, the mutant mice exhibit lower heart rates during physical activity, and a higher endurance. Mini Muscle Mice also exhibit larger kidneys and livers. All of these morphological deviations influence the behavior and metabolism of the mouse. For example, mice with the Mini Muscle mutation were observed to have a higher per-gram aerobic capacity. The mini-muscle allele shows a mendelian recessive behavior. The mutation is a single nucleotide polymorphism (SNP) in an intron of the myosin heavy polypeptide 4 gene.

=== Cellular functions and DNA repair ===
==== DNA repair proteins ====
DNA repair pathways that repair damage to cellular DNA use many different proteins. These proteins often have other functions in addition to DNA repair. In humans, defects in some of these multifunctional proteins can cause widely differing clinical phenotypes. As an example, mutations in the XPB gene that encodes the largest subunit of the basal Transcription factor II H have several pleiotropic effects. XPB mutations are known to be deficient in nucleotide excision repair of DNA and in the quite separate process of gene transcription. In humans, XPB mutations can give rise to the cancer-prone disorder xeroderma pigmentosum or the noncancer-prone multisystem disorder trichothiodystrophy. Another example in humans is the ERCC6 gene, which encodes a protein that mediates DNA repair, transcription, and other cellular processes throughout the body. Mutations in ERCC6 are associated with disorders of the eye (retinal dystrophy), heart (cardiac arrhythmias), and immune system (lymphocyte immunodeficiency).

== See also ==
- cis-regulatory element
- Enhancer (genetics)
- Epistasis
- Genetic correlation
- Metabolic network
- Metabolic supermice
- Polygene
