= Twin Registry =

Twin Registry may refer to:

- Twin registry, an article about twin registries in general
- Michigan State University Twin Registry, registry of twins produced by researchers at Michigan State University
- Minnesota Twin Registry, project by researchers at the University of Minnesota related to the Minnesota Twin Family Study
- TwinsUK, a registry of twins in the United Kingdom
- Vietnam Era Twin Registry, a registry of American twins who served in the Vietnam War
