= Klump =

Klump is a German surname. Notable people with the name are:

- Andrea Klump (born 1957), German terrorist
- Brigitte Klump (1935–2023), German author
- J. Val Klump (born 1948), American limnologist
- Kelly Klump, American psychologist
- Olive Whitlock Klump (1902–1980), American nurse

== Fictional ==
- Midge Klump, a character in Archie comics
- The Klump family, titular characters from The Nutty Professor (1996 film)
- Klumps, characters in Donkey Kong video games

== See also ==
- Klumpp
- Klump, a village in Winzenburg, Lower Saxony, Germany
- Rasmus Klump, comic series
- Uni-Engine, also known as "Klump pump"
