= Donald W. Black =

American psychiatrist

- Born: February 15, 1956 (age 70)
- Education: Stanford University; University of Utah School of Medicine; University of Iowa
- Awards: Scientific Achievement Award from the National Center for Responsible Gaming (2016); Manfred Guttmacher Award from the American Psychiatric Association and the American Academy of Psychiatry and the Law (2023)
- Scientific career
- Fields: Psychiatry
- Workplaces: University of Iowa

Donald W. Black (born February 15, 1956) is an American psychiatrist, researcher and professor emeritus of psychiatry at the University of Iowa. He is the editor-in-chief of the Annals of Clinical Psychiatry. A researcher on gambling disorder, he received the Scientific Achievement Award from the National Center for Responsible Gaming in 2016. Black has lectured nationally and internationally and has authored more than 400 publications.

== Education ==
Black is a native of Salt Lake City, Utah and was educated in the public school system. He was selected at age 16 to serve as a United States Senate Page in Washington, D.C. by Senator Frank Moss (D-Utah). Black is an honors graduate of Stanford University and received a bachelor's degree in human biology. He received his medical degree from the University of Utah School of Medicine and his master's degree in preventive medicine from the University of Iowa. Black completed his psychiatry residency and a fellowship in psychiatric epidemiology at the University of Iowa. Black is board certified in psychiatry by the American Board of Psychiatry and Neurology.

== Career ==
Black served on the faculty of the University of Iowa Carver College of Medicine from 1986 to 2020, and for many years directed the psychiatry training program. He has also served as Associate Chief of Staff for Mental Health at the Iowa City Veterans Administration hospital. He is current president of the American Academy of Clinical Psychiatrists, an organization that emphasizes evidence-based care.

Black's research is clinical and translational. His work has focused on severe personality disorders and behavioral addictions. He is an authority on antisocial and borderline personality disorders and is the author of Bad Boys, Bad Men - Confronting Antisocial Personality Disorder, now in its third edition. He co-authored The Textbook of Antisocial Personality Disorder with Nathan J. Kolla. Black and Kolla shared the 2023 Manfred Guttmacher Award jointly awarded by the American Psychiatric Association and the American Academy of Psychiatry and the Law. He is also an expert on gambling disorder and received several grants from the NIH to study its genetics, treatment, and course. With colleague Nancee Blum, a psychotherapist and social worker, he demonstrated the effectiveness of Systems Training for Emotional Predictability and Problem Solving (STEPPS), a group treatment for those with borderline personality disorder. Through their efforts, the program has been disseminated worldwide, and has become widespread in the United Kingdom and The Netherlands.

Black has received numerous awards for his clinical care of patients, his teaching, and his research. He has been listed in "Best Doctors" since 1996, and received both the University of Iowa Distinguished Faculty Award and the Earnest O. Thielen Clinical Teaching and Service Award in 2012. He is co-author with Nancy C. Andreasen of the bestselling Introductory Textbook of Psychiatry, now in its seventh edition, which has been translated into many languages. Black has served on many national committees, including a focus group organized by the United States Office of the Director of National Intelligence. He has served on many "study sections" for the NIH and chaired the Adult Psychopathology and Disorders of Aging study section for two years.
