= Kelly Klump =

American clinical psychologist

- Citizenship: American
- Education: University of Minnesota
- Known for: Research on eating disorders
- Scientific career
- Fields: Clinical psychology Psychiatric genetics
- Workplaces: Michigan State University
- Thesis: Genetic and environmental influences on eating attitudes and behaviors in adolescent female twins (1998)
- Doctoral advisors: Gloria Leon; William Iacono

Kelly Lynn Klump is an American clinical psychologist and MSU Foundation Endowed Professor in the Department of Psychology at Michigan State University, known for her research on the genetics of eating disorders. She is also the co-director (with S. Alexandra Burt) of the Michigan State University Twin Registry.
