= Wendy Johnson =

American differential psychologist

- Born: October 2, 1955 (age 71)
- Education: Occidental College; San Francisco State University; University of Minnesota
- Known for: Research on human intelligence and personality
- Awards: American Psychological Association Award for Distinguished Scientific Early Career Contributions to Psychology (2011)
- Scientific career
- Fields: Differential psychology
- Workplaces: University of Edinburgh
- Thesis: Antecedents of Individual Differences in Academic Achievement (2005)
- Doctoral advisor: Matthew McGue, Thomas Bouchard

Wendy Johnson (born October 2, 1955) is an American differential psychologist and professor of psychology at the University of Edinburgh. She holds the chair in Differential Development in the Department of Psychology and Centre for Cognitive Ageing and Cognitive Epidemiology at the University of Edinburgh.

Johnson researches human intelligence and personality.

== Biography ==
Johnson grew up in Tacoma, Washington, United States. She graduated from Occidental College in California with a mathematics degree in 1977. In 1991, she founded Pacific Actuarial Consultants, of which she served as president until 2001. She began studying psychology at San Francisco State University in 1995, where she completed a Master of Arts degree in Developmental Psychology in 1999. In 2005, she completed a PhD in Behavior Genetics and Individual Differences, with a minor in Statistics, at the University of Minnesota. At Minnesota, Johnson worked on the Minnesota Twin Family Study, under the supervision of Matt McGue and Thomas J. Bouchard Jr. As a graduate student, Johnson was awarded the 2004 John B. Carroll Award for Research Methodology from the International Society for Intelligence Research.

After completing a post-doctoral fellowship at the Minnesota Center for Twin and Family Research, Johnson moved to the University of Edinburgh in 2007. Johnson was supported by a research fellowship from Research Council of the United Kingdom before joining the faculty of the University of Edinburgh in 2010. At Edinburgh, Johnson became involved in longitudinal research with Ian Deary one of the Lothian Birth Cohort. Their research program originated in the Scottish Mental Surveys that tested the intelligence of almost every child born in Scotland in 1921 or 1936, with follow-up studies conducted to the present day.

Johnson received the American Psychological Foundation Robert L. Fantz Memorial Award for Young Psychologists in 2010. In 2011, she received the American Psychological Association's Award for Distinguished Scientific Early Career Contributions to Psychology, in recognition of "innovative research explicating the nature, origin, and consequences of individual differences in intelligence and personality." Johnson was also listed as "Rising Star" by the Association for Psychological Science.

== Research ==
Johnson's research focuses on genetics, environmental, and social factors that influence the intelligence from childhood to adulthood, and longitudinal relationships between intelligence and other outcomes such as health. Some of her studies have looked a multiple factors in relation to academic achievement over time, including family risk factors, intelligence, depression, and child academic engagement. Her studies utilize quantitative genetic models that specify systematic transactions between genetic and environmental influences on behavior. In some research, twins separated at birth were studied to determine what familial and environmental factors contribute to individual traits, such as intelligence, and if these traits differ if each twin was exposed to different circumstances.

Her 2004 paper "Genetic and environmental structure of adjectives describing the domains of the Big Five model of personality: A nationwide US twin study," co-authored with Robert F. Krueger, was named Best Paper of the Year by the Journal of Research in Personality. This twin study aimed to specify genetic and environmental influences on Big Five personality traits (Openness, Conscientiousness, Extraversion, Agreeableness, Neuroticism). It was determined that Big Five traits have complex etiology with both genetics and outside factors influencing these traits.

Some of her work has examined genetic influences on general intelligence, often referred to as g. Her research validates the psychological construct of a higher-level g factor that is not closely associated with any specific test, but rather reflects shared variance across multiple mental ability tests.

== Representative publications ==
- Deary, I. J., Johnson, W., & Houlihan, L. M. (2009). Genetic foundations of human intelligence. Human genetics, 126(1), 215–232.
- Deary, I. J., Penke, L., & Johnson, W. (2010). The neuroscience of human intelligence differences. Nature Reviews Neuroscience, 11(3), 201–211.
- Johnson, W. (2007). Genetic and environmental influences on behavior: Capturing all the interplay. Psychological Review, 114(2), 423–440.
- Johnson, W., & Bouchard Jr, T. J. (2005). The structure of human intelligence: It is verbal, perceptual, and image rotation (VPR), not fluid and crystallized. Intelligence, 33(4), 393–416.
- Johnson, W., Bouchard Jr, T. J., Krueger, R. F., McGue, M., & Gottesman, I. I. (2004). Just one g: Consistent results from three test batteries. Intelligence, 32(1), 95–107.
- Johnson, W., & Krueger, R. F. (2006). How money buys happiness: Genetic and environmental processes linking finances and life satisfaction. Journal of Personality and Social Psychology, 90(4), 680–691.
