= Tim Spector =

British epidemiologist

Tim Spector OBE FMedSci
- Born: July 1958 (age 68); London, England
- Education: St Bartholomew's Hospital Medical College; London School of Hygiene & Tropical Medicine
- Occupations: Professor of genetic epidemiology; science writer; co-founder of Zoe Ltd

Timothy David Spector OBE FMedSci (born 1958) is a British epidemiologist, medical doctor, and science writer, working on the relationship between nutrition, the gut microbiome, and health. He argues against low-fat diets and fad diets, and instead advocates for a Mediterranean-style diet that is heavily plant-based, high in fibre, limits ultra-processed foods, and includes a diversity of plants and fermented food.

== Biography ==
Spector was born in North London in July 1958. His mother was an Australian physiotherapist and competitive swimmer; his father was Walter Graham Spector (1924–1982), a pathologist.

After being privately educated at University College School, London, Spector trained in medicine at St Bartholomew's hospital medical school.

He rose to the position of consultant rheumatologist, before turning to genetic epidemiology, the study of genetic factors in health and disease, in 1992.

Spector is professor of genetic epidemiology and director of the TwinsUK registry at King's College London. He is a specialist in twin studies, genetics, epigenetics, the gut microbiome, and diet.

He was appointed Officer of the Order of the British Empire (OBE) in the 2020 Birthday Honours for services to the Covid-19 response. He was also appointed Senior Investigator at the National Institute for Health Research (NIHR).

== Twin studies ==
Spector's team at King's College have, since 1992, enrolled 15,000 sets of identical twins in the TwinsUK studies, leading to many studies on the heritability of diseases and disorders. Spector states the goal is "to understand nature versus nurture".

== The Diet Myth ==
Spector's book The Diet Myth: The Real Science Behind What We Eat was published in 2015. The book explains how gut microbiotas may interact with different dietary habits and how the gut microbiome can determine health and longevity. It received positive reviews in science journals. Spector argues for a diet that increases gut microbe diversity. To do this he recommends increasing fibre content, avoiding junk food and ultra-processed foods, and experimenting with different fresh foods.

== Spoon Fed ==
In his book Spoon Fed (2020), Spector discusses how most modern diets are not backed by science, and that much of the nutrition information online is not supported by evidence. He also discusses how microbes may affect mental health.

== Food For Life ==
In Food For Life (2022), Spector explains how foods affect our bodies and the role of the gut microbiome in long-term health. It also discusses how modern farming and the food industry impact planetary health.

== Ferment ==
In his 2025 book, Ferment, Spector explores the new science of fermented foods. He draws from the latest research and his own experience of fermenting at home.

== COVID Symptom Study ==
In March 2020, during the onset of the COVID-19 pandemic in the UK, Spector made use of twins already taking part in a genetic study to begin an investigation of COVID-19 symptoms. Working with researchers at King's College, Guy's and St Thomas' Hospitals, an app used by twins to record nutrition was used as the basis for the COVID Symptom Study app to allow members of the public to make a daily record of their symptoms and state of health. By July 2020 the app had more than 4 million users, and the next month the project received grant funding from the Department of Health and Social Care. Development and operation of the app involves Zoe Global Limited (now Zoe Limited), a nutrition advice company co-founded by Spector in 2017.

Spector became the public face of the study, releasing periodic summaries via YouTube from June 2020 onwards.

== Selected publications ==
- Ferment: Life-Changing Power of Microbes, Vintage, 2025.
- Food for Life: The New Science of Eating Well. Random House. 2022. ISBN 978-1-4735-5226-5.
- Spoon-Fed: Why Almost Everything We've Been Told About Food is Wrong. Random House. 2020. ISBN 978-1-4735-7640-7.
- The Diet Myth: The Real Science Behind What We Eat (1st ed.). London: Weidenfeld & Nicolson. 2015. ISBN 978-0-297-60919-3.
- Identically Different: Why We Can Change Our Genes. Abrams Books. 2012. ISBN 978-1-4683-1040-5.
- Spector, Tim D.; Snieder, Harold; MacGregor, Alex J. (1999). Advances in Twin and Sib-pair Analysis. Greenwich Medical Media. ISBN 978-1-84110-004-3.
