= North American gambling treatment centers =

North American gambling treatment centers are intended to treat gambling addiction. In general, gambling addiction treatment is considered an add-on to other addiction treatments. All three treatment centers that offer gambling addiction treatment in North America treat gambling in addition to alcohol addiction and other substances addictions.

== Inpatient Centers offering care ==
There are not many in-patient centers offering care for compulsive gambling, even though neurological research indicates the treatment is not significantly different from other substance abuse addictions.

In general the treatment of gamblers is not a significant in-patient percentage compared to the number of alcoholics and drug addictions treated. This is largely due to the financial realities: in-patient addiction rehabilitation costs an average of $24,000 per person, and when compulsive gamblers seek help, they are usually broke.

== Outpatient Care ==
Gamblers Anonymous is the most common outpatient care program. It cites less than 8% retention/abstention rate over the first year of treatment.

== See also ==
- Problem gambling
- Alcoholism
- Drug rehabilitation
- Williamsville Wellness
- Gamblers Anonymous
