= LGBTQ people and military service =

Lesbian, gay, bisexual, transgender, and queer (LGBTQ) personnel are able to serve in the armed forces of some countries around the world: the vast majority of industrialized, Western countries including some South American countries, such as Argentina, Brazil and Chile in addition to other countries, such as Canada, Japan, Australia, Mexico, France, Finland, Denmark and Israel. The rights concerning intersex people are more vague.

This keeps pace with the latest global figures on acceptance of homosexuality, which suggest that acceptance of LGBTQ communities is becoming more widespread only in secular, affluent countries.

However, an accepting policy toward gay and lesbian soldiers does not invariably guarantee that LGBTQ citizens are immune to discrimination in that particular society. Even in countries where LGBTQ persons are free to serve in the military, activists lament that there remains room for improvement. Israel, for example, a country that otherwise struggles to implement LGBTQ-positive social policy, nevertheless has a military well known for its broad acceptance of openly gay soldiers.

History has seen societies that both embrace and shun openly gay service-members in the military. But more recently, the high-profile 2010 hearings on "Don't ask, don't tell" in the United States propelled the issue to the center of international attention. They also shed light both on the routine discrimination, violence, and hardship faced by LGBTQ-identified soldiers, as well as arguments for and against a ban on their service.

== History ==
In ancient Greece, the Sacred Band of Thebes was a military unit from 378 BCE which consisted of male lovers who were known for their effectiveness in battle. Same-sex love also occurred among the Samurai class in Japan, being practiced between an adult and a younger apprentice.

However, homosexual behavior has been considered a criminal offense according to civilian and military law in some countries throughout history. There are various accounts of trials and executions of members of the Knights Templar in the fourteenth century and British sailors during the Napoleonic Wars for homosexuality. Official bans on gays serving in the military first surfaced in the early 20th century. The U.S. introduced a ban in a revision of the Articles of War of 1916 and the UK first prohibited homosexuality in the Army and Air Force Acts in 1955. Canada formally persecuted LGBTQIA+ service members and public servants during the Cold War as part of the Anti-gay purges in Canada. However some nations, of which Sweden is the most well-known case, never introduced bans on homosexuality in the military, but issued recommendations on exempting homosexuals from military service.

To regulate homosexuality in the U.S. military, physical exams and interviews were used to spot men with effeminate characteristics during recruitment. These exams included having wider hips and the absence of a gag reflex in prospective soldiers. Both of these physical characteristics could get a man disqualified from service. Many soldiers accused of homosexual behavior were discharged for being "sexual psychopaths", although the number of discharges greatly decreased during wartime efforts.

The rationale for excluding gays and lesbians from serving in the military is often rooted in cultural norms and values and has changed over time. Originally, it was believed that gays were not physically able to serve effectively. The most common argument during the later 20th century focused more on military effectiveness. And finally, more recent justifications include the potential for conflict between heterosexual and homosexual service members and possible "heterosexual resentment and hostility."

Many countries have since revised these policies and allow gays and lesbians to openly serve in the military (e.g. Israel in 1993 and the UK in 2000). There are currently more than 30 countries, including nearly all NATO members, which allow gays and lesbians to serve, and around 10 more countries that do not outwardly prohibit them from serving.

The U.S. was one of the last developed nations to overturn its ban on allowing gays, lesbians and bisexuals to openly serve in the military when it repealed the Don't Ask Don't Tell policy in 2010.

== Being LGBT in the military ==
In the United States, despite policy changes allowing for open LGBTQ military service and the provision of some benefits to same-sex military couples, cultures of homophobia and discrimination persist.

Several academics have written on the effects on employees in non-military contexts concealing their sexual orientation in the workplace. Writers on military psychology have linked this work to the experiences of LGBQ military service personnel, asserting that these studies offer insights into the lives of open LGBQ soldiers and those who conceal their orientation. Sexual orientation concealment and sexual orientation linked harassment are stressors for LGBT individuals that lead to negative experiences and deleterious job-related outcomes. Specifically, non-open LGBT persons are found to experience social isolation. In particular, these products of work related stress can affect military job performance, due to the high reliance on connection and support for the well-being of all service members.

In the United States, LGBQ soldiers are not required to disclose their sexual orientation, suggesting that some LGBQ service members may continue to conceal their sexual orientation. Studies suggest this could have harmful effects for the individual. A 2013 study conducted at the University of Montana found that non-open LGB US veterans face significantly higher rates of depression, posttraumatic stress disorder, and alcohol or other substance abuse than their heterosexual counterparts. These veterans also reported facing significant challenges serving while concealing their sexual orientation; 69.3% of subjects in the study reported experiencing fear or anxiety as a result of concealing their sexual identity, and 60.5% reported that those experiences led to a more difficult time for the respondent than heterosexual colleagues. This study also concludes that 14.7% of LGB American veterans made serious attempts at suicide. This rate of suicide attempts compares to another study of the entire American veteran community that found .0003% of American veterans attempt suicide.

Evidence suggests that for LGB service members in the United States, the conditions of service and daily life have improved dramatically following the repeal of Don't Ask, Don't Tell. Soldiers who choose to come out experience feelings of liberation, and report that no longer having to hide their orientation allows them to focus on their jobs. Support groups for LGB soldiers have also proliferated in the United States.

=== Discrimination ===
In the US army, six states (Texas, Georgia, Louisiana, Mississippi, Oklahoma and West Virginia) initially refused to comply with Defense Secretary Chuck Hagel's order that gay spouses of National Guard members be given the same federal marriage benefits as heterosexual spouses, forcing couples to travel hours round trip to the nearest federal installation. Furthermore, some benefits offered on bases, like support services for relatives of deployed service members, could still be blocked. This changed with a ruling by US Attorney General Loretta Lynch in the Supreme Court on 26 June 2015 which ruled that Federal marriage benefits would be made available to gay couples in all 50 US states.

In 2013, legal changes were said to revert to practices to those before Don't Ask, Don't Tell, the National Defense Authorization Act contains language some claimed permitted individuals to continue discriminating against LGB soldiers.

From June 30, 2016, to April 11, 2019, transgender personnel in the United States military were allowed to serve in their preferred gender upon completing transition. From January 1, 2018, to April 11, 2019, transgender individuals could enlist in the United States military under the condition of being stable for 18 months in their preferred or biological gender. On July 26, 2017, President Donald Trump announced on his Twitter page that transgender individuals would no longer be allowed "to serve in any capacity in the U.S. Military", effectively reinstating the ban. The ban was overturned by President Joe Biden in 2021.

In Australia, Canada, Germany, Israel, Italy, the Netherlands, and United Kingdom, as of 2010, when civil partnerships became legal in the respective countries, military family benefits followed the new laws, without discrimination.

Fear of discrimination may prevent military service members to be open about their sexual orientation. A 2004 report stated that in some cases, in Belgium, homosexual personnel have been transferred from their unit if they have been "too open with their sexuality." As of 2004, the Belgian military reserved the right to deny gay and lesbian personnel high-level security clearances, for fear they may be susceptible to blackmail. In 1993, a study showed that in Canada, France, Germany, Israel, the Netherlands and Norway, the number of openly homosexual service members was small, representing only a minority of homosexuals usually serving. Serving openly may make their service less pleasant or impede their careers, even though there were no explicit limitations to serve. Thus service members who acknowledged their homosexuality were "appropriately" circumspect in their behavior while in military situations; i.e. they did not call attention to themselves. As of 2010, in the Danish army, LGBT military personnel refrain from being completely open about their homosexuality. Until training is completed and a solid employment is fixed they fear losing respect, authority and privileges, or in worse cases their job in the Danish army. In 2010, the same updated study showed that in Australia, Canada, Germany, Israel, Italy and United Kingdom, no special treatment to prevent discrimination was in place in those armies, the issue is not specifically addressed, it is left to the leadership discretion. Commanders said that sexual harassment of women by men poses a far greater threat to unit performance than anything related to sexual orientation.

On the other hand, the Dutch military directly addressed the issue of enduring discrimination, by forming the Homosexuality and Armed Forces Foundation, a trade union that continues to represent gay and lesbian personnel to the ministry of defense, for a more tolerant military culture. Although homosexuals in the Dutch military rarely experience any explicitly aggressive acts against them, signs of homophobia and cultural insensitivity are still present.

=== Violence ===
Physical, sexual, psychological (harassment, bullying) violence faced by LGBT is a fact of life for many LGBT identified persons. In an inherently violent environment, LGBT people may face violence unique to their community in the course of military service.

According to a 2012 news article, while the Israeli Defense Force does not ask the sexual orientation of its soldiers, half of the homosexual soldiers who serve in the IDF suffer from violence and homophobia. LGBT soldiers are often victims of verbal and physical violence and for the most part, commanders ignore the phenomenon.

SAPRO, the organization responsible for the oversight of the Department of Defense (DoD - US) sexual assault policy, produces the "Workplace and Gender Relations Survey of Active Duty Member (WGRA)": The 2012 report does not have any paragraph studying the specific situation of LGBT people. The study focuses on men and women. The specificity of the violence faced by LGBT people is not considered.

In the Australian army, the problem is not known officially; only a few cases of harassment and discrimination involving gays and lesbians have been recorded. A researcher mentioned that "one would not want to be gay and in the military": Although there has been no major public scandal regarding harassment of gays, this does not mean that such behavior does not occur, but it has been under-studied. Generally, however, incidents of discrimination or harassment brought to the attention of commanders are handled appropriately, incidents in which peers who had made inappropriate remarks are disciplined by superiors promptly and without reservation.

In the United States military, sexual violence in the form of harassment and assault affects a large percentage of its LGBT soldiers. Research conducted through an online survey and published in the Journal of Traumatic Stress shows that 80.7% of LGB and 83.9% of transgender service members, reported experiencing sexual harassment during their time in the military. The survey also found that 25.7% of LGB and 30.4% of transgender service members reported experiencing sexual assault. These researchers concluded that their findings pointed to LGBT service members being at a higher risk of sexual and/or stalking victimization.

These forms of sexual victimization against LGBT U.S. military service members have been linked to adverse mental health effects ranging from depressive symptoms to suicidal behavior. LGBT veterans experienced posttraumatic stress disorder (PTSD), depressive symptoms, substance use, and suicidal behavior among other mental health issues oftentimes at a higher rate than non-LGBT veterans. It was found that depression, anxiety, and substance use disorders are 1.5 times more common in the LGBT community as well as evidence that supports the thought that members of the LGBT community who have gone through physical, sexual, and emotional trauma have a higher risk of suicide. The statistics reflect that 11.48% of LGB veterans reported that they had "seriously considered" attempting suicide within the past year, compared to 3.48% of heterosexual veterans. According to national data from the Vietnam Era Twin Registry, when looking at veterans who had at least one same-gendered sexual partner in their lifetime, 55.3% of them reported suicidal ideation, compared to just 25.2% of those with no same-gender partners. In terms of attempting suicide, among the veterans surveyed with at least one same-gender partner, 14.7% reported they had attempted, compared to just 3.9% of veterans with no same-gender partner. In veterans who could not or did not serve openly in the military, they were found to suffer from higher rates of depression and PTSD specifically associated with concealing their sexual orientation while in the service.

There are mental health care options available for LGBT veterans, but studies show that those in need of care may avoid it due to past experiences or fear of stigma in healthcare settings, or the belief that healthcare professionals are not equipped to meet their needs due to lack of training. Studies have supported this hypothesis by looking at physicians' "knowledge, attitudes, and perceptions of their clinical competence," finding that many are, or at least think they are, inadequately prepared to properly care for patients that identify as LGBT and/or are veterans.

== Arguments regarding inclusion ==
=== Arguments for inclusion ===
Until recently, many countries banned gays and lesbians from serving openly in the armed forces. The reasons to enforce this ban included the potential negative impact on unit cohesion and privacy concerns. However, many studies commissioned to examine the effects on the military found that little evidence existed to support the discriminatory policy. Moreover, when the bans were repealed in several countries including the UK, Canada, and Australia, no large scale issues arose as a result.

Several studies provide evidence that allowing gays and lesbians to openly serve in the armed forces can result in more positive work related outcomes. Firstly, discharging trained military personnel for their sexual orientation is costly and results in loss of talent. The total cost for such discharges in the U.S. for violating the Don't Ask Don't Tell policy amounted to more than 290 million dollars. Secondly, privacy for service members has actually increased in countries with inclusive policies and led to a decrease in harassment. Many gays and lesbians do not disclose their sexual orientation once the ban is repealed. Finally, allowing gays to openly serve ends decades of discrimination in the military and can lead to a more highly qualified pool of recruits. For instance, the British military reduced its unfilled position gap by more than half after allowing gays to openly serve. Therefore, more evidence exists now to support policies that allow gays and lesbians to openly serve in the military.

=== Arguments against inclusion ===
While most research data have all but debunked traditional arguments in favor of policies like Don't Ask, Don't Tell, homosexuality is still perceived by many countries to be incompatible with military service.

A recurrent argument for a ban on homosexuals in the military rests on the assumption that, in the face of potentially homosexual members of their unit, prospective recruits would shy away from military service. Based on an inconclusive study produced by the RAND Corporation in the run-up to the repeal of Don't Ask, Don't Tell, American military recruits were expected to decrease by as much as 7%. However, this does not appear to have materialized.

In a line of work that regularly demands that personnel be in close living quarters, allowing openly homosexual servicemen is argued to flout a fundamental tenet of military service: ensuring that soldiers remain undistracted from their mission. If gay men are allowed to shower with their fellow male soldiers, so goes the argument, this would, in effect, violate the "unique conditions" of military life by putting sexually compatible partners in close proximity, with potentially adverse effects on retention and morale of troops. Testimony advanced during the hearings on Don't Ask, Don't Tell of 1993, with US Senator Sam Nunn and General Norman Schwarzkopf Jr. recalled "instances where heterosexuals have been solicited to commit homosexual acts, and, even more traumatic emotionally, physically coerced to engage in such acts".

== Transgender military service ==
Like sexual orientation, policies regulating the service of transgender military personnel vary greatly by country. Based on data collected by the Hague Centre for Strategic Studies, more than 20 countries currently allow transgender people to serve in their military. These include Argentina, Australia, Austria, Belgium, Bolivia, Brazil, Canada, Chile, the Czech Republic, Denmark, Estonia, Finland, France, Germany, Greece, Ireland, Israel, Japan, Mexico, the Netherlands, New Zealand, Norway, Portugal, Spain, Sweden, Switzerland, Ukraine, the United Kingdom, and Uruguay.

While the US military's Don't Ask, Don't Tell policy was rescinded in 2011 allowing open service by gay, lesbian, and bisexual service members, transgender people were still barred from entering the US military. This ban, which was subsequently removed, was effective via enlistment health screening regulations: "Current or history of psychosexual conditions (302), including but not limited to transsexualism, exhibitionism, transvestism, voyeurism, and other paraphilias." Unlike Don't Ask, Don't Tell, this policy was not a law mandated by Congress, but an internal military policy. Studies suggest that the propensity of trans individuals to serve in the US military is as much as twice that as cisgender individuals. In the Harvard Kennedy School's 2013 National Transgender Discrimination Survey, 20% of transgender respondents reported having served in the armed forces, compared with 10% of cisgender respondents.

American transgender veterans face institutional hardships, including the provision of medical care while in the armed services and after discharge stemming from their gender identity or expression. Transgender veterans may also face additional challenges, such as facing a higher rate of homelessness and home foreclosure, higher rates of losing jobs often directly stemming from their trans identity, and high rates of not being hired for specific jobs because of their gender identity.

== Intersex military service ==
The armed forces of Israel, the United States and Australia have employed intersex individuals depending on the nature of their conditions, but the guidelines are vague and seldom talked about.

== LGBT Military Index ==
The LGBT Military Index is an index created by the Hague Centre for Strategic Studies in 2014 that uses 19 indicative policies and best practices to rank over 100 countries on the inclusion of lesbian, gay, bisexual and transgender service members in the armed forces. Countries with higher rankings, especially the ones at the top, stand out for their multiple concerted efforts to promote the inclusion of gay and lesbian soldiers. In many of them special support and advocacy organizations are present. By contrast, countries near the bottom of the index show the lack of aspiration to promote greater inclusion of the LGBT military personnel. The United States, Japan, Canada, Australia, Finland, Denmark, France, Israel, Chile, Argentina, Brazil and Mexico are among countries whose LGBT militaries can serve. Countries where there are laws prohibiting this action include Pakistan, Bangladesh, Indonesia, Malaysia, Brunei, Nigeria, Algeria, Egypt, Iran, Russia and Turkey and so on.

== Table ==
Legend
LGBT people can serve
Only LGB
Prohibited
unknown or unclear
No Military

Legality of Military Service by LGBT people
Country	Status
Abkhazia	Unknown or unclear
Afghanistan	Prohibited
Albania	Only LGB
Algeria	Prohibited
Argentina	LGBT people can serve
Andorra	No Military
Angola	Unknown or unclear
Antigua and Barbuda	Prohibited
Armenia	Prohibited
Australia	LGBT people can serve
Austria	LGBT people can serve
Azerbaijan	Prohibited
Bahamas	Only LGB
Bahrain	Prohibited
Bangladesh	Prohibited
Barbados	Prohibited
Belarus	Prohibited
Belgium	LGBT people can serve
Belize	Prohibited
Benin	Unknown or unclear
Bhutan	Prohibited
Bolivia	LGBT people can serve
Bosnia and Herzegovina	Only LGB
Botswana	Only LGB
Brazil	LGBT people can serve
Brunei	Prohibited
Bulgaria	Only LGB
Burkina Faso	Unknown or unclear
Burundi	Prohibited
Cambodia	Unknown or unclear
Cameroon	Prohibited
Canada	LGBT people can serve
Cape Verde	Unknown or unclear
Central African Republic	Unknown or unclear
Chad	Prohibited
Chile	LGBT people can serve
China	Unknown or unclear
Colombia	Only LGB
Comoros	Prohibited
Congo	Unknown or unclear
Costa Rica	No Standing Military
Croatia	Only LGB
Cuba	LGBT people can serve
Cyprus	Only LGB
Czech Republic	LGBT people can serve
Democratic Republic of the Congo	Unknown or unclear
Denmark	LGBT people can serve
Dominica	Prohibited
Dominican Republic	Prohibited
Djibouti	Unknown or unclear
East Timor	Unknown or unclear
Ecuador	Unknown or unclear
Egypt	Prohibited
El Salvador	Only LGB
Equatorial Guinea	Unknown or unclear
Eritrea	Prohibited
Estonia	LGBT people can serve
Eswatini	Prohibited
Ethiopia	Prohibited
Fiji	Unknown or unclear
Finland	LGBT people can serve
France	LGBT people can serve
Gabon	Prohibited
Gambia	Prohibited
Georgia	Unknown or unclear
Germany	LGBT people can serve
Ghana	Prohibited
Greece	LGBT people can serve
Grenada	No Military
Guatemala	Unknown or unclear
Guinea	Prohibited
Guinea-Bissau	Unknown or unclear
Guyana	Prohibited
Haiti	No Standing Military
Honduras	Prohibited
Hungary	Only LGB
Iceland	No Standing Military
India	Prohibited
Indonesia	Prohibited
Iran	Prohibited
Iraq	Prohibited
Ireland	LGBT people can serve
Israel	LGBT people can serve
Italy	Only LGB
Ivory Coast	Unknown or unclear
Jamaica	Prohibited
Japan	LGBT people can serve
Jordan	Unknown or unclear
Kazakhstan	Only LGB
Kenya	Prohibited
Kiribati	No Military
Kosovo	Only LGB
Kuwait	Prohibited
Kyrgyzstan	Unknown or unclear
Laos	Unknown or unclear
Latvia	Only LGB
Lebanon	Prohibited
Lesotho	Unknown or unclear
Liberia	Prohibited
Libya	Prohibited
Liechtenstein	No Military
Lithuania	LGBT people can serve
Luxembourg	LGBT people can serve
Madagascar	Unknown or unclear
Malawi	Prohibited
Malaysia	Prohibited
Maldives	Prohibited
Mali	Prohibited
Malta	LGBT people can serve
Marshall Islands	No Military
Mauritania	Prohibited
Mauritius	Unknown or unclear
Mexico	LGBT people can serve (Legal Limbo)
Micronesia	No Military
Moldova	Only LGB
Monaco	LGBT people can serve (France responsible for Defense)
Mongolia	Unknown or unclear
Montenegro	Only LGB
Morocco	Prohibited
Mozambique	Prohibited
Myanmar	Prohibited
Namibia	Only LGB
Nauru	No Military
Nepal	Only LGB
Netherlands	LGBT people can serve
New Zealand	LGBT people can serve
Nicaragua	Unknown or unclear
Niger	Unknown or unclear
Nigeria	Prohibited
Northern Cyprus	Prohibited
North Korea	Unknown or unclear
North Macedonia	Only LGB
Norway	LGBT people can serve
Oman	Prohibited
Pakistan	Prohibited
Palau	No Military
Palestine	Prohibited
Panama	No Standing Military
Papua New Guinea	Prohibited
Paraguay	Only LGB
Peru	Only LGB
Philippines	LGBT people can serve (Gender expression is restricted to gender stated in certificate of live birth)
Poland	Only LGB
Portugal	LGBT people can serve
Qatar	Prohibited
Romania	Only LGB
Russia	Prohibited
Rwanda	Unknown or unclear
Saint Kitts and Nevis	Prohibited
Saint Lucia	No Military
Saint Vincent and the Grenadines	No Military
São Tomé and Principe	Unknown or unclear
Samoa	No Military
San Marino	Unknown or unclear
Saudi Arabia	Prohibited
Senegal	Prohibited
Serbia	Only LGB
Seychelles	Unknown or unclear
Sierra Leone	Prohibited
Singapore	Only LGB
Slovakia	Only LGB
Slovenia	Only LGB
Solomon Islands	Prohibited
Somalia	Prohibited
Somaliland	Prohibited
South Africa	Only LGB
South Korea	Unknown or unclear
South Ossetia	Unknown or unclear
South Sudan	Prohibited
Spain	LGBT people can serve
Sri Lanka	Prohibited
Sudan	Prohibited
Suriname	Unknown or unclear
Sweden	LGBT people can serve
Switzerland	LGBT people can serve
Syria	Prohibited
Taiwan	Only LGB
Tajikistan	Unknown or unclear
Tanzania	Prohibited
Thailand	LGBT people can serve
Togo	Prohibited
Tonga	Prohibited
Transnistria	Unknown or unclear
Trinidad and Tobago	Prohibited
Tunisia	Prohibited
Turkey	Prohibited
Turkmenistan	Prohibited
Tuvalu	No Military
Uganda	Prohibited
Ukraine	LGBT people can serve (Ban removed or lifted for transgender people)
United Arab Emirates	Prohibited
United Kingdom	LGBT people can serve
United States	Only LGB
Uruguay	LGBT people can serve
Uzbekistan	Prohibited
Vanuatu	Unknown or unclear
Vatican City	No Military
Venezuela	Only LGB
Vietnam	Only LGB
Western Sahara	Prohibited
Yemen	Prohibited
Zambia	Prohibited
Zimbabwe	Prohibited

== See also ==
- LGBT healthcare in the United States Veterans Health Administration

== Sources ==
- Shilts, Randy (1994/1997/2005). Conduct Unbecoming: Gays and Lesbians in the US Military. ISBN 5-551-97352-2 / ISBN 0-312-34264-0.
