= Danielle Hairston =

American psychiatrist, author

- Born: Washington, D.C.
- Education: Rutgers University; Howard University College of Medicine
- Awards: 2020 Top 12 Women in White Coats Hero
- Scientific career
- Fields: Psychiatry
- Workplaces: Howard University College of Medicine

Danielle Hairston is an American psychiatrist who is Director of Residency Training in the Department of Psychiatry at Howard University College of Medicine, and a practicing psychiatrist in the Division of Consultation-Liaison Psychiatry at the University of Maryland Medical Center in Baltimore, Maryland. Hairston is also the Scientific Program Chair for the Black Psychiatrists of America and the President of the American Psychiatric Association's Black Caucus.

== Early life and education ==
Hairston was born in the metropolitan area of Washington, D.C. Her father worked in the military and her mother worked as a teacher. Before college, she decided she wanted to pursue medicine. She pursued an undergraduate degree in Biological Sciences at Rutgers University in New Jersey and then a medical degree at Howard University College of Medicine in Washington, D.C. During medical school, Hairston became interested in psychiatry, and in 2012, pursued her residency in general psychiatry at Howard University and went on to become the Chief Resident in the Department of Psychiatry.

== Career and research ==
Hairston joined the faculty at the University of Maryland School of Medicine in the Department of Psychiatry, while pursuing her fellowship training in Consultation-Liaison Psychiatry.

In 2018, she returned to Howard University College of Medicine as the Psychiatry Residency Training Director. She is also a member of the Curriculum Task Force for the Department of Psychiatry. Hairston is also a practicing psychiatrist in the Division of Consultation-Liaison Psychiatry at the University of Maryland Medical Center in Baltimore, Maryland, with a practice in both general psychiatry and psychosomatic medicine.

Since 2016, Hairston has served as Scientific Program Chair of the Black Psychiatrists of America and was elected as President of the Black Caucus of the American Psychiatric Association. She was the Early Career Representative for the APA's Black Caucus She started a community outreach program to facilitate the partnership between mental health professionals, like herself, and faith groups in the community and is a Work Group Member of the Mental Health:A Guide for Faith Leaders.

=== Advocacy for Black physicians ===
Hairston was one of ten Black physicians who spoke about issues facing Black physicians in the #SharetheMicNowMed campaign. In an interview with NPR, she shared her own personal experiences with bias in medicine when one of her white colleagues mistook her for a patient's caregiver. "I don't even necessarily think that he's racist," Hairston said. "It's just that that's the bias."

=== Traumatic media exposure and mental illness ===
Hairston's clinical work and publications focus on the effects of racism on mental health. In a Slate news article, she discussed how media-based distress, such as posting videos and pictures of police brutality against Black people, is traumatic and can lead to mental health consequences in the Black community. She and her colleagues have been advocating for a change in the DSM-5 criteria to include media-based trauma to account for the severe trauma that Black people disproportionately face. She has treated patients with media-based trauma related distress and she is an advocate for the awareness of the potential for these exposures to lead to depression and post-traumatic stress disorder. She uses her social media presence to advocate and educate her followers on how to be an ally for victims of racial trauma.

=== Writing ===
In 2018, Hairston was a contributing author the book Racism and Psychiatry: Contemporary Issues and Interventions discussing the origins of racism in medicine, and specifically in her field of psychiatry. She contributed to the first chapter on the Origins of Racism in American Medicine and Psychiatry and discusses how the thoughts, actions, and behaviors of healthcare workers can impact the health of Black patients in the chapter Clinician Bias in Diagnosis and Treatment.

Der Spiegel quoted Hairston on the impact of violent images.

== Awards and honors ==
- 2020 Lifetime Power of Women Honoree
- 2020 Top 12 Women in White Coats Hero
- 2019 Harvard-Macy Award

== Publications ==
- Gordon-Achebe K., Hairston D.R., Miller S., Legha R., Starks S. (2019) Origins of Racism in American Medicine and Psychiatry. p. 3-19 in: Medlock M., Shtasel D., Trinh NH., Williams D. (eds) Racism and Psychiatry. Series: Current Clinical Psychiatry. Cham: Humana Press. Cited 3 times by Jan.13, 2021.
- Hairston, D. R., de Similien, R. H., Himelhoch, S., & Forrester, A. (2019). Treatment of phantom shocks: A case report. International Journal of Psychiatry in Medicine, 54(3), 181–187. https://doi.org/10.1177/0091217418802153 Cited 1 time by Jan.13, 2021.
- Hairston D.R., Gibbs T.A., Wong S.S., Jordan A. (2019) Clinician Bias in Diagnosis and Treatment. p. 105-137 in: Medlock M., Shtasel D., Trinh NH., Williams D. (eds.) Racism and Psychiatry. Series: Current Clinical Psychiatry. Cham: Humana Press,. Cited 6 times by Jan.13, 2021.
- Similien, Ralph & Hairston, Danielle & Kumari, Suneeta & Matthews, Gary & Wasser, Tobias & Malik, Mansoor & Manalai, Partam. (2018). Sociodemographic and clinical correlates of the frequently hospitalized African American patients with severe and persistent mental illness. Annals of Clinical Psychiatry. 30: 305–310. not cited by Jan.13, 2021
- Ralph de Similien MD, Lee BL, Hairston DR, Sonje S. Sick, or faking it?. Current Psychiatry. 2019 Sep;18(9):49. not cited by Jan.13, 2021
