= Wendy Slutske =

American psychologist

- Born: Wendy Sue Slutske
- Education: University of Wisconsin; University of Minnesota
- Awards: Scientific Achievement Award from the National Center for Responsible Gaming (2011)
- Scientific career
- Fields: Behavior genetics Psychology
- Institutions: University of Missouri
- Thesis: A twin and family study of personality and the genetics of alcoholism (1993)
- Doctoral advisors: Auke Tellegen; Matt McGue

Wendy Sue Slutske is an American psychologist and behavior geneticist known for her research on alcohol use disorder, gambling disorder, and other addictive disorders. She is a professor and director of the Center of Excellence in Gambling Research at the University of Missouri, where she has taught since 1997. In 2011, she received the National Center for Responsible Gaming's Scientific Achievement Award in recognition of her gambling research.
