= Patrik Magnusson (academic) =

Swedish genetic epidemiologist

- Born: Patrik Karl Erik Magnusson; 1969 (age 55–56)
- Education: Uppsala University
- Scientific career
- Fields: Genetic epidemiology
- Institutions: Karolinska Institute
- Thesis: Genetic susceptibility to cervical and gastric cancer (2000)

Patrik Karl Erik Magnusson (born 1969) is a Swedish genetic epidemiologist and senior researcher at the Karolinska Institute, where he leads the Swedish Twin Registry. He was listed as an ISI Highly Cited Researcher in 2017.
