= Xiangming Chen =

Xiangming Chen (Chinese: 陈向明; simplified Chinese: 陈向明; traditional Chinese: 陳向明; pinyin: Chén Xiàngmíng) served as the founding dean and director of urban and global studies and director of the Center for Urban and Global Studies at Trinity College in Hartford, Connecticut, from 2007 to 2019. He is currently the Paul E. Raether Distinguished Professor of Global Urban Studies and Sociology at Trinity College. Prior to this, Chen served as assistant to full professor of sociology and adjunct professor of political science and urban planning and policy at the University of Illinois at Chicago.

Chen holds the positions of distinguished guest professor in the School of Social Development and Public Policy at Fudan University in Shanghai, China, adjunct professor at the graduate school of the Shanghai Academy of Social Sciences, and honorary research fellow at the Institute of Economics of Shanghai Academy of Social Sciences and the IC² Institute at the University of Texas at Austin. He has also taught at Yale University.

Chen has received fellowships and grants from the American Council of Learned Societies, the American Sociological Association, the Chiang Ching-kuo Foundation for International Scholarly Exchange, Open Society Foundations, and the Regional Studies Association.

== Education ==
Chen studied English at the Beijing Foreign Studies University. He received his Ph.D. in sociology from Duke University.

== Scholarly work ==
Chen co-authored The World of Cities: Places in Comparative and Historical Perspective with Anthony Orum. Chen is the author of As Borders Bend: Transnational Spaces on the Pacific Rim, which was a finalist for the Association of Borderland Studies Book Award in 2007.

He edited and contributed to Shanghai Rising: State Power and Local Transformations in a Global Megacity; co-edited and contributed to Rethinking Global Urbanism: Comparative Insights from Secondary Cities; co-authored Introduction to Cities: How Place and Space Shape Human Experience (Wiley-Blackwell, 2012; second edition, 2018); co-edited and contributed to Confronting Urban Legacy: Rediscovering Hartford and New England's Forgotten Cities; and co-edited and contributed to Global Cities, Local Streets: Everyday Diversity from New York to Shanghai.

Chen helped create, and is currently a senior contributor for the “China & the World” series at The European Financial Review. His articles have appeared in major urban studies and international social science journals such as Urban Affairs Review, International Journal of Urban and Regional Research, City & Community, Urban Geography, Environment and Planning A, International Journal of Comparative Sociology, Globalizations, Cambridge Journal of Regions, Economy and Society, Transnational Corporations, and many edited books.

=== Books ===
- Yuan Ren, Xiangming Chen, and Dieter Läpple (Eds.), The Era of Global City-Regions (in Chinese). Shanghai: Fudan University Press
- Xiangming Chen (editor and author of introduction and co-author of conclusion and three other chapters), Shanghai Rising: State Power and Local Transformations in a Global Megacity (12 chapters). Minneapolis: University of Minnesota Press
- Jiaming Sun and Xiangming Chen (Eds.), Empirical Approaches to Urban Sociology. New Delhi: Indo American Books
- Xiangming Chen, As Borders Bend: Transnational Spaces on the Pacific Rim. Lanham, MD: Rowman & Littlefield Publishers
- Zhou Zhenhua, Chen, Xiangming, and Huang Jianfu (Eds.), World Cities: International Lessons and Shanghai's Development (in Chinese). Shanghai: Shanghai Academy of Social Sciences Press
- Anthony M. Orum and Xiangming Chen, The World of Cities: Places in Comparative and Historical Perspective. Oxford: Blackwell Publishers

=== Journal articles ===
- Xiangming Chen and Tomas de'Medici (Trinity College '11), "The Instant City" Coming of Age: The Production of Spaces in China's Shenzhen Special Economic Zone." Urban Geography 31 (8): 1141–1147.
- Xiangming Chen, “Introduction: Why Chinese and Indian Megacities?” City & Community 8 (4): 363–368.
- Xiangming Chen and Jiaming Sun, “Untangling a Global-Local Nexus: Sorting Out Residential Sorting in Shanghai.” Environment and Planning A 39 (10): 2324–2345.
- Dow Scott, James Bishop, and Xiangming Chen, “An Examination of the Relationship of Employee Involvement with Job Satisfaction, Employee Cooperation, and Intention to Quit in U.S. Invested Enterprises in China.” International Journal of Organizational Analysis 11 (1): 3–19.
- Xiangming Chen, "Taiwan Investments in China and Southeast Asia: 'Go West But Also Go South'." Asian Survey XXXVI (5): 447–467.

== Associations ==
Chen has served on the board of trustees of the Alfred Herrhausen Society, the International Forum of the Deutsche Bank, the advisory board of the Urban Age project based at the London School of Economics, and the World Affairs Council of Connecticut. Chen also served as president of the North American Chinese Sociologists Association and on the Council for the Community and Urban Sociology Section of the American Sociological Association. He has consulted for the United Nations (Conference on Trade and Development), the Asian Development Bank, the World Bank, the Brookings Institution, and the Organisation of Economic Co-operation and Development, OECD.
