= John J. Sheehan =

United States Marine Corps general

Jack Sheehan
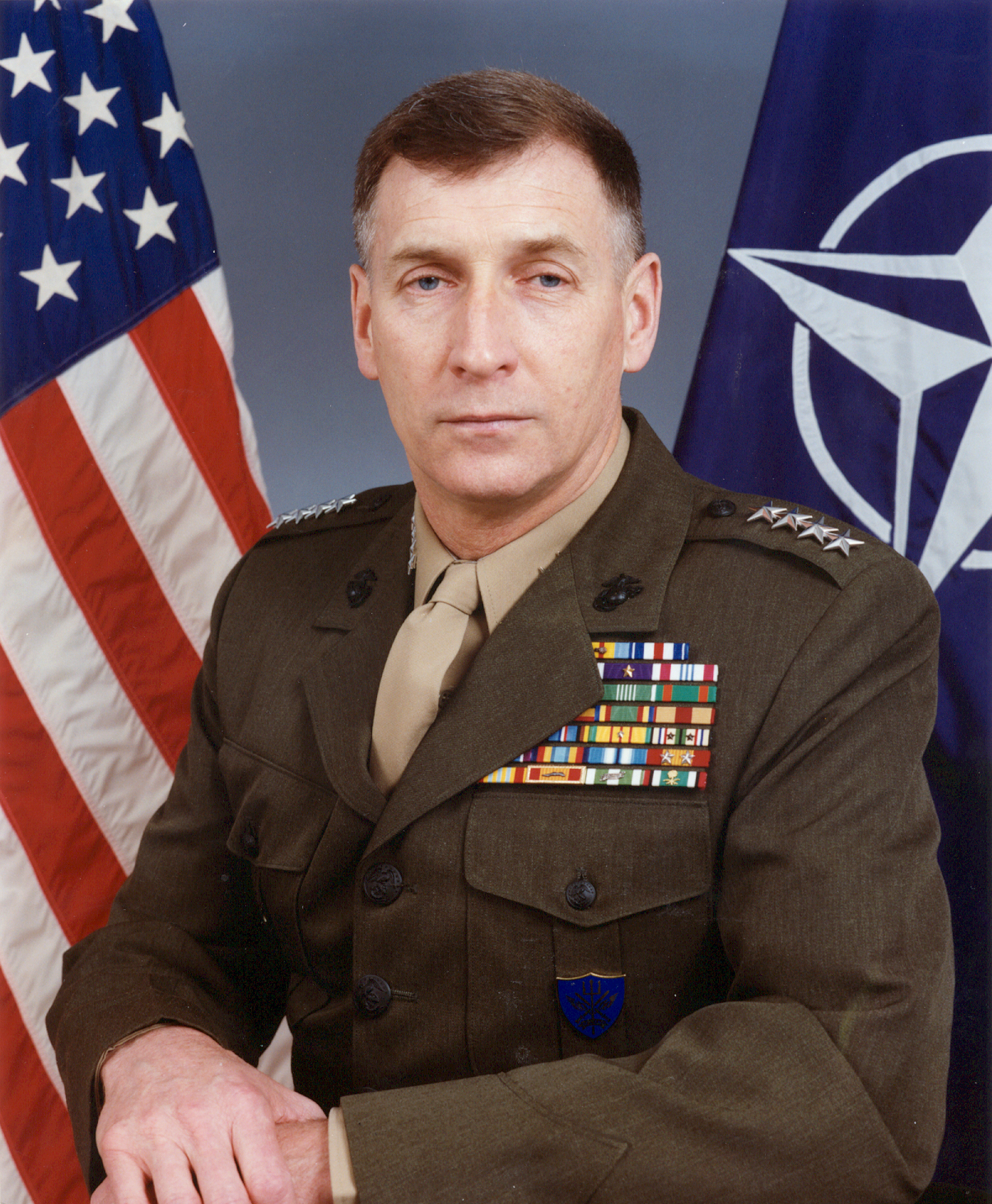
- Born: August 23, 1940 (age 86); Somerville, Massachusetts, U.S.
- Military career
- Allegiance: United States of America
- Branch: United States Marine Corps
- Service years: 1962–1997
- Rank: General
- Commands: Supreme Allied Commander Atlantic, NATO; Commander-in-Chief, U.S. Atlantic Command
- Awards: Defense Distinguished Service Medal (2); Silver Star; Defense Superior Service Medal; Bronze Star (2) w/ Valor V Purple Heart (2)
- Other work: Bechtel International, Sr. VP; U.S. State Dept. Defense Policy Board

John Joseph "Jack" Sheehan (born August 23, 1940) is a retired United States Marine Corps general. His final active duty commands, culminating 35 years of service in the Marine Corps, were as the Supreme Allied Commander Atlantic (SACLANT) for NATO and as Commander-in-Chief for the U.S. Atlantic Command (CINCUSACOM) (1994–1997).

== Life and career ==
Sheehan was born on August 23, 1940, in Somerville, Massachusetts. The son of Irish immigrants, he is one of seven children. He graduated with a B.A. degree in English from Boston College in June 1962. After graduation, he was commissioned a second lieutenant in the U.S. Marine Corps. As a captain, Sheehan was awarded the Silver Star Medal for gallantry during combat operations from September 14 to 17, 1968. He holds an M.S. degree from Georgetown University in Government. His professional military education includes the Amphibious Warfare School, Naval Command and Staff College, and National War College.

He served in various command positions ranging from company commander to brigade commander in both the Atlantic and Pacific theater of operations. Sheehan assumed command of 8th Marine Regiment from 14 November 1986 to 16 May 1988. Sheehan's served a combat tour in Desert Shield/Desert Storm. His staff positions included duties as regimental, division, and service headquarters staff officer as well as joint duty with the United States Army, the Office of the Secretary of Defense, and the U.S. Atlantic Command.

Before assuming his final duties as Supreme Allied Commander, Atlantic and Commander in Chief, U.S. Atlantic Command on October 31, 1994, General Sheehan served as Director for Operations, J-3, Joint Staff, Washington, D.C. General Sheehan retired from the Marine Corps on September 24, 1997.

In 1998, Sheehan joined Bechtel International as a senior vice president. While remaining with Bechtel, Sheehan joined the Military Officers Association of America board of directors in 2012. He became chairman of the board in 2016.

== Controversy ==
On March 18, 2010, Sheehan testified to the U.S. Congress that military failures by UN peacekeeping troops during the Yugoslav Wars was caused by the "liberalization" and "unionization" of European armies, particularly those of "nations like Belgium, Luxembourg, the Dutch". Sheehan claimed their militaries were more concerned with internal "socialisation" than fighting capacity after the dissolution of the Soviet Union. Sheehan cited the fall of Srebrenica as an example, which he attributed in part due to homosexual men serving in the Dutch military, who had been assigned to defend the town, describing the battalion as "understrength and poorly led". During the same testimony, Sheehan stated that gays weakened the army, while attraction between men and women in gender-integrated units would not. Sheehan stated that his opinion was based on remarks made by the chief of staff of the Dutch forces, "Hankman Berman", whom Sheehan claimed had been "fired by the parliament because he couldn't find anyone else to blame"; the Dutch Ministry of Defence assumes that Sheehan meant General Henk van den Breemen, Dutch chief of staff at the time of the Srebrenica genocide. General van den Breemen denied having said such a thing and called Sheehan's comments "total nonsense". Dutch Minister of Defense Eimert van Middelkoop stated that Sheehan's statement was "disgraceful," "unworthy of anyone in the military". Prime-Minister Jan Peter Balkenende of the Netherlands stated that Sheehan's words are "shameful", "outrageous", "beneath contempt" and "disrespectful towards all troops involved". Dutch advocates of gay rights, organized in the Pink Army (foundation) and the Stichting Homosexualiteit en Krijgsmacht ("Foundation Homosexuality and Armed Forces"), announced a libel lawsuit against Sheehan, demanded public apologies, and for Sheehan to follow sensitivity training. The majority of the Dutch parliament voiced their support for the class action.

On March 29, 2010, Dutch media reported that Sheehan had sent an e-mail to his Dutch colleague General Henk van den Breemen in which he apologized for his comments. He stated that his memory of the conversation was inaccurate.

== Awards and decorations ==
His decorations and medals include:

| 1st Row | | Defense Distinguished Service Medal w/ 1 oak leaf cluster | | |
| 2nd Row | Silver Star | Defense Superior Service Medal | Bronze Star w/ 1 award star & valor device | Purple Heart w/ 1 award star |
| 3rd Row | Defense Meritorious Service Medal | Meritorious Service Medal | Army Commendation Medal | Navy and Marine Corps Achievement Medal |
| 4th Row | Combat Action Ribbon | Navy Presidential Unit Citation | Navy Unit Commendation | Marine Corps Expeditionary Medal |
| 5th Row | National Defense Service Medal w/ 1 service star | Armed Forces Expeditionary Medal | Vietnam Service Medal w/ 5 service stars | Southwest Asia Service Medal w/ 2 service stars |
| 6th Row | Humanitarian Service Medal | Navy Sea Service Deployment Ribbon | Arctic Service Ribbon | Vietnam Gallantry Cross w/ 2 silver stars |
| 7th Row | Vietnam Armed Forces Honor Medal, 2nd class | National Order of Merit (France), Officer | Order of Merit (Portugal), Grand Cross | Order of Merit of the Republic of Hungary, Commander's Cross with Star (Military) |
| 8th Row | Royal Norwegian Order of Merit, Grand Cross | Vietnam Gallantry Cross Unit Citation | Vietnam Campaign Medal | Kuwait Liberation Medal (Saudi Arabia) |
| Badge | Supreme Allied Commander Atlantic | | | |

== See also ==
- Sexual orientation and the military of the Netherlands
- Sexual orientation and gender identity in military service
