= Concordance (genetics) =

Presence of the same trait in two individual organisms

In genetics, concordance is the probability that a pair of individuals will both have a certain characteristic (phenotypic trait) given that one of the pair has the characteristic. Concordance can be measured with concordance rates, reflecting the odds of one person having the trait if the other does. The pair of individuals are concordant if both present the trait and discordant if only one presents it. Important clinical examples include the chance of offspring having a certain disease if the mother has it, if the father has it, or if both parents have it.

Concordance among siblings is similarly of interest: what are the odds of a subsequent offspring having the disease if an older child does? In research, concordance is often discussed in the context of both members of a pair of twins. Twins are concordant when both have or both lack a given trait. The ideal example of concordance is that of identical twins, because the genome is the same, an equivalence that helps in discovering causation via deconfounding, regarding genetic effects versus epigenetic and environmental effects (nature versus nurture). In contrast, discordance occurs when a similar trait is not shared by the persons. Studies of twins have shown that genetic traits of monozygotic twins are fully concordant, whereas in dizygotic twins, half of genetic traits are concordant, while the other half are discordant. Discordant rates that are higher than concordant rates express the influence of the environment on twin traits.

== Studies ==
A twin study compares the concordance rate of identical twins to that of fraternal twins. This can help suggest whether a disease or a certain trait has a genetic cause. Controversial uses of twin data have looked at concordance rates for homosexuality and intelligence. Other studies have involved looking at the genetic and environmental factors that can lead to increased LDL in women twins.

Because identical twins are genetically virtually identical, it follows that a genetic pattern carried by one would very likely also be carried by the other. If a characteristic identified in one twin is caused by a certain gene, then it would also very likely be present in the other twin. Thus, the concordance rate of a given characteristic helps suggest whether or to what extent a characteristic is related to genetics.

There are several problems with this assumption:

1. A given genetic pattern may not have 100% penetrance, in which case it may have different phenotypic consequences in genetically identical individuals;
2. Developmental and environmental conditions may be different for genetically identical individuals. If developmental and environmental conditions contribute to the development of the disease or other characteristic, there can be differences in the outcome of genetically identical individuals;
3. The logic is further complicated if the characteristic is polygenic, i.e., caused by differences in more than one gene.
4. Epigenetic effects can alter the genetic expressions in twins through varied factors. The expression of the epigenetic effect is typically weakest when the twins are young and increases as the identical twins grow older.
5. Where in the absence of one or more environmental factors a condition will not develop in an individual, even with high concordance rates, the proximate cause is environmental, with strong genetic influence: thus "a substantial role of genetic factors does not preclude the possibility that the development of the disease can be modified by environmental intervention." So "genetic factors are assumed to contribute to the development of that disease", but cannot be assumed alone to be causal.

== Genotyping studies ==
In genotyping studies where DNA is directly assayed for positions of variance (see SNP), concordance is a measure of the percentage of SNPs that are measured as identical. Samples from the same individual or identical twins theoretically have a concordance of 100%, but due to assaying errors and somatic mutations, they are usually found in the range of 99% to 99.95%. Concordance can therefore be used as a method of assessing the accuracy of a genotyping assay platform.

Because a child inherits half of his or her DNA from each parent, parents and children, siblings, and fraternal (dizygotic) twins have a concordance that averages 50% using this measure.

== See also ==
- Michigan State University Twin Registry
