= William Iacono =

American psychologist

William G. Iacono
- Born: William George Iacono
- Education: Carnegie Mellon University; University of Minnesota
- Known for: Minnesota Twin Family Study
- Awards: 2008 Award for Distinguished Contributions to Psychophysiology from the Society for Psychophysiological Research
- Scientific career
- Fields: Behavior genetics Clinical psychology Psychophysiology
- Institutions: University of Minnesota
- Thesis: Individual differences in smooth pursuit and saccadic eye movements and manual tracking performance in monozygotic twins: Some implications for schizophrenia (1978)
- Doctoral advisor: David T. Lykken
- Doctoral students: S. Alexandra Burt

William George Iacono is an American psychologist known for his research in behavior genetics. He uses methodologies such as twin and adoption studies, to study the development of common mental disorders and substance abuse.

He has also researched the relationship between substance use and cognitive impairment among adolescents.

He is a Distinguished McKnight University Professor in the Department of Psychology at the University of Minnesota, where he is also the co-director, with Matt McGue, of the Minnesota Center for Twin and Family Research.

Before joining the faculty of the University of Minnesota in 1985, he was an associate professor at the University of British Columbia.
