= Alfred Herrhausen =

German banker (1930–1989)

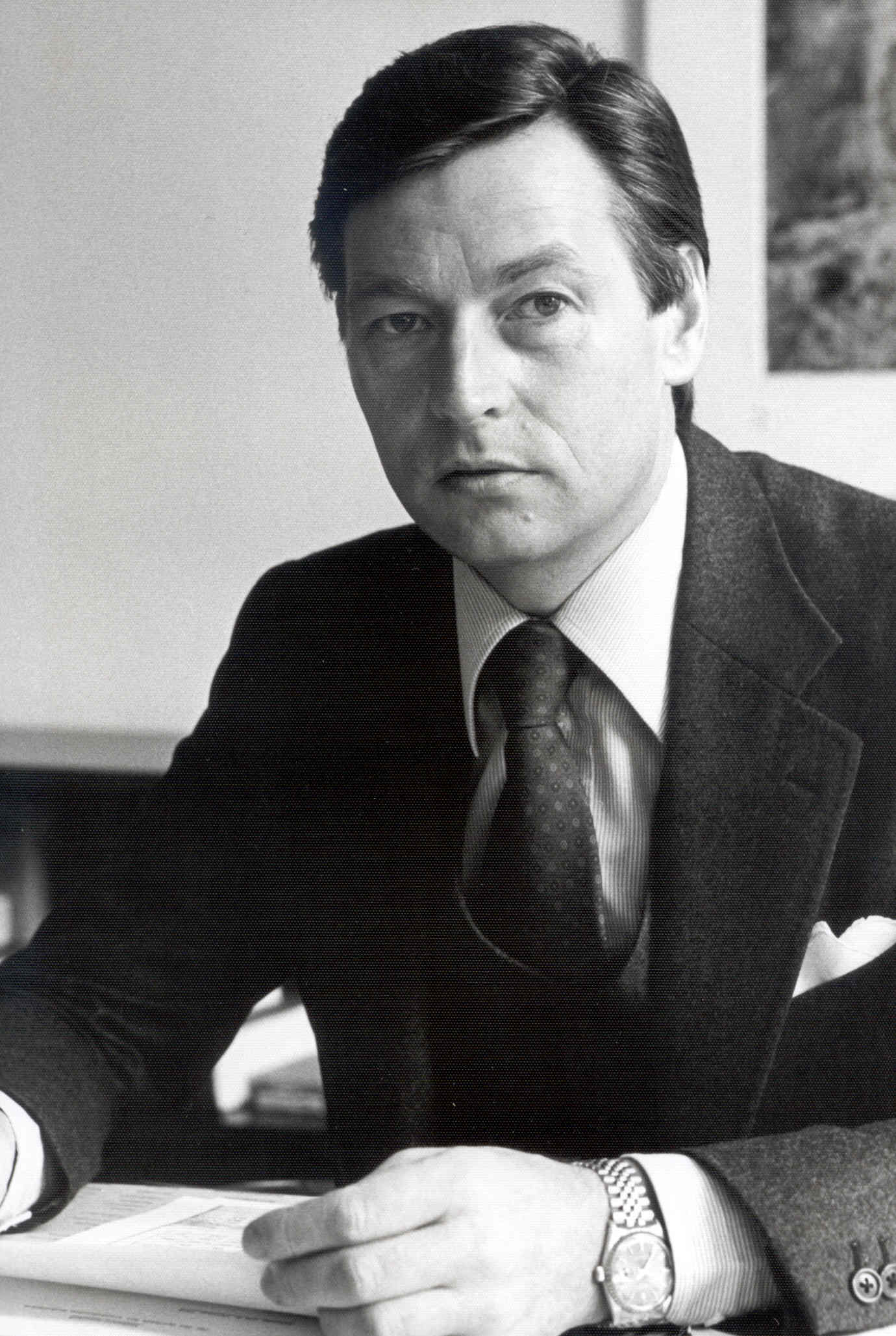
Alfred Herrhausen (1985)

Alfred Herrhausen (30 January 1930 – 30 November 1989) was a German banker and the Chairman of Deutsche Bank who was born in Essen and assassinated in Bad Homburg vor der Höhe in 1989. He was a member of the Steering Committee of the Bilderberg Group and from 1971 onwards a member of Deutsche Bank's management board. An advisor to Helmut Kohl (chancellor since 1982) and a proponent of a unified European economy, he was also an influential figure in shaping the policies towards developing countries.

Herrhausen began his career in the energy industry. His goal was to transform Deutsche Bank into a global universal bank with an integrated investment banking division and to strengthen its competitive position on the international stage. In his public statements, Herrhausen did not limit himself to financial policy issues. He often offered fundamental insights into aspects of the economic, social, and political order, which also brought him attention. He was regarded not only as a spokesperson for his bank, but—avant la lettre—as a spokesperson for “Deutschland AG.” Especially in the second half of the 1970s and the second half of the 1980s, he was deeply involved in the debate over the “power of the banks.” Beginning in the fall of 1987, Herrhausen publicly advocated for reducing the debt burdens of heavily indebted developing countries. This initiative sparked discussions far beyond his industry.

== Assassination ==
Herrhausen was killed shortly after leaving his home in Bad Homburg by an explosively formed projectile that penetrated his armoured car. West German far-left terrorist group Red Army Faction claimed responsibility, but the charges against the organisation were dropped due to lack of evidence and nobody has been charged with the murder since.

He was being chauffeured to work in his armoured Mercedes-Benz car, with bodyguards in both a lead vehicle and another following behind. The 7-kg bomb was hidden in a bag on a bicycle parked next to the road. The bicycle had been consistently parked without explosive in the same location along Herrhausen's route for an extended period of time before the assassination, and it was, therefore, ignored by Herrhausen's security. The bomb was detonated when Herrhausen's car interrupted a beam of infrared light as it passed the bicycle. The bomb targeted the most vulnerable area of Herrhausen's car – the door where he was sitting – and required split-second timing to overcome the car's special armour plating. The bomb used a Misnay–Schardin mechanism. A copper plate, placed between the explosive and the target, was deformed and projected by the force of the explosion. The detonation resulted in a mass of copper being projected towards the car at a speed of nearly two kilometres per second, efficiently penetrating the armoured Mercedes. Herrhausen's legs were severed and he bled to death.

== Aftermath ==
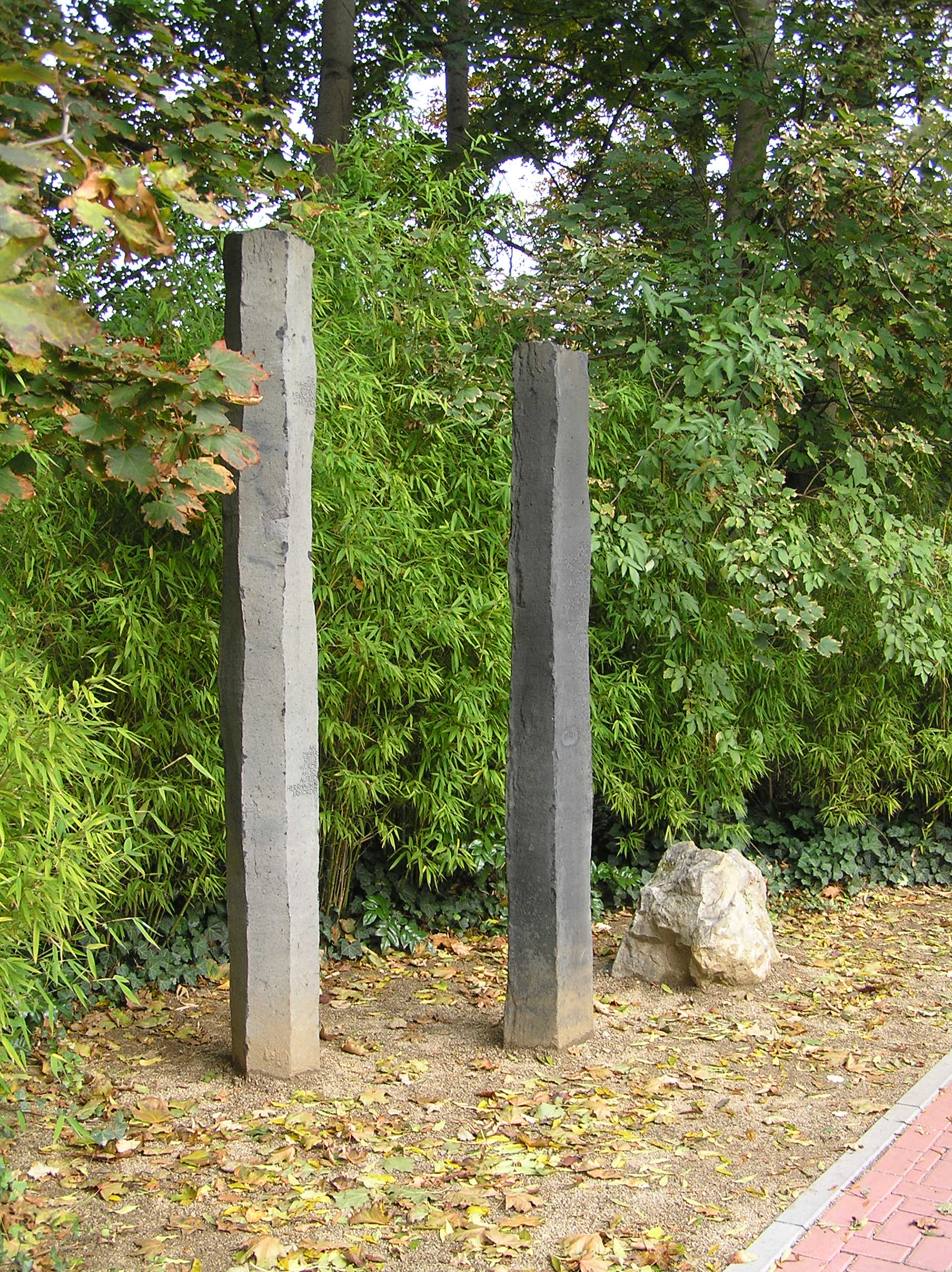
Memorial marking the site of Herrhausen's assassination, Bad Homburg

No one has ever been charged with the murder. The German federal prosecutor's office had listed Andrea Klump and Christoph Seidler of the Red Army Faction as the only suspects. The Federal Criminal Police Office (Germany) presented a chief witness, Siegfried Nonne, who later retracted his statements in which he claimed to have sheltered four terrorists in his home. His half-brother Hugo Föller, furthermore, declared that no other persons had been at the flat at the time. On 1 July 1992, German television broadcast Nonne's explanations of how he was coached and threatened by the Verfassungsschutz, the German internal intelligence agency, to become the main witness. In the same year, the Alfred Herrhausen Society was established to honour his memory. In 2023, Deutsche Bank stopped supporting this society. In 2004, the federal prosecutor dropped the charges against the Red Army Faction; the investigation was to continue without naming a suspect. Certain German and US media connected the assassination of Alfred Herrhausen to the Staatssicherheitsdienst (Stasi) of the GDR.

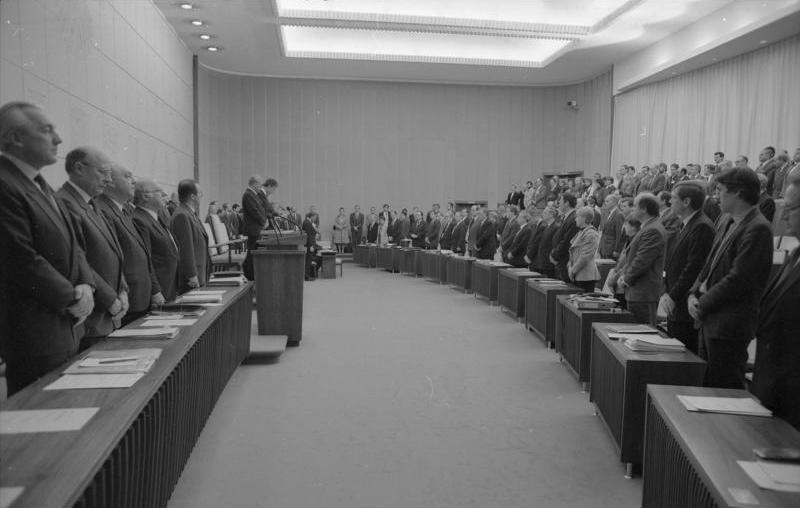
Members of the West German Federal Council hold a moment of silence for the death of Herrhausen.

Some reports in the 2000s have claimed that future Russian president Vladimir Putin, then a KGB agent in Dresden, East Germany, was the handler of the Red Army Faction members involved in the assassination. However, a 2023 investigation by Der Spiegel reported that the anonymous source behind those reports had never been an RAF member and was "considered a notorious fabulist" with "several previous convictions, including for making false statements".

In 2008, journalist Carolin Emcke published Stumme Gewalt ("Mute Force"), a memorial to Herrhausen, her godfather, encouraging dialogues between groups in societies, without violence, revenge and disrespect. She received the Theodor Wolff Prize for the text.

== In popular culture ==
- The 2001 German documentary film Black Box BRD is centered upon the lives and deaths of Herrhausen and Wolfgang Grams, a RAF member who was a major suspect in the attack on Herrhausen.
- The assassination is depicted in episode 4 of the German spy TV series Deutschland 89.
- The 2024 miniseries Herrhausen: The Banker and the Bomb depicts the life of Herrhausen in the 1980s, leading to his assassination.

== See also ==
- List of unsolved murders (1980–1999)
