= Twin registry =

A twin registry is a database of information about both identical twins and fraternal twins, which is often maintained by an academic institution, such as a university, or by other research institutions.

== Investigative use ==
The use of twins can improve the statistical power of a genetic study by reducing the amount of genetic and/or environmental variability. "Identical twins" (monozygotic (MZ) twins) share virtually all their genes with each other, and "fraternal twins" (dizygotic (DZ) twins), on average, share about 50% of their genes with each other (about the same amount of sharing as non-twin siblings). Both types of twin pairs in twin registries almost always share similar prenatal and early childhood environments as well. By determining what are called "concordance" rates for a disease or trait among identical and fraternal twin pairs, researchers can estimate whether contributing factors for that disease or trait are more likely to be hereditary, environmental, or some combination of these. A concordance rate is a statistical measure of probability - if one twin has a specific trait or disease, what is the probability that the other twin has (or will develop) that same trait or disease. In addition, with structural equation modeling and multivariate analyses of twin data, researchers can offer estimates of the extent to which allelic variants and environment may influence phenotypic traits.

== Where maintained ==
Some twin registries seek to cover all twins in an entire country, including Sweden, Denmark, Norway, Finland, Australia, Sri Lanka and the United Kingdom. The Swedish Twin Registry is the largest twin database in the world, with approximately 85,000 twin pairs.

Other twin registries cover a more limited geographic scope and are maintained by researchers at academic institutions, such as the Michigan State University Twin Registry, a registry of twins produced by researchers at Michigan State University, the Washington State Twin Registry, a registry of twins produced by researchers at Washington State University, and the Minnesota Twin Registry project by researchers at the University of Minnesota related to the Minnesota Twin Family Study. The largest twin registry in the United States is the Mid-Atlantic Twin Registry (MATR) at Virginia Commonwealth University, which has more than 51,000 registered participants, with approximately 46,000 of these representing intact twin pairs.

== Limitations ==
Many twin registries depend on the voluntary participation of twins – that is, participation in these twin registries is not compulsory, and twins must voluntarily elect whether or not to register with a twin registry (and later, whether to participate in research projects). This characteristic limitation of many twin registries leads to standard issues known as "recruitment bias" or "volunteer bias". Recruitment biases include an over-inclusion of twins who share similar characteristics, and over-inclusion of identical twins and female twins:

"[T]his recruitment bias ... results in ... overestimation of the true heritability of the trait under study."

Twin registries use a number of strategies to try to reduce the risk of recruitment bias. Some twin registries are "mandatory" - that is, for example, under the public health laws of Norway, all births of twins since 1967 have been recorded in a twin registry maintained by the Norwegian government. By comparison, enlisting with the Australian Twin Registry is voluntary. While the twin registry in Sri Lanka is based on volunteer twins, that twin registry has made extensive out-reach efforts, such as examining hospital birth records, and then making multiple follow-up efforts (including in-person visits) to find the twins and have them (or their parents) agree to be registered.
