= Klumpp =

Klumpp is a German surname. Notable people with the surname include:

- Christiane Klumpp (born 1976), German rhythmic gymnast
- Elmer Klumpp (1906–1996), American baseball player
- Erwin Klumpp (1921–2010), Swiss water polo player
- Johannes Klumpp (born 1980), German conductor
- Werner Klumpp (1928–2021), German politician

== See also ==
- Klump (disambiguation)
