= Center for Urban and Global Studies =

The Center for Urban and Global Studies (CUGS) is a research institution at Trinity College devoted to the study of urban and global issues.

The Center for Urban and Global Studies plays a central role in advancing Trinity College’s strategic mission of integrated urban and global education on campus, in Hartford, and globally. CUGS is the first of its kind at a liberal arts college. CUGS promotes curricular initiatives, research projects, and civic engagement with a broad urban and global focus by working closely with the departments and programs at Trinity, a variety of organizations in the city of Hartford, and international partners. CUGS provides a variety of student curricular and research grant programs, such as the Kathryn Wasserman Davis 100 Projects for Peace, the Technos College International Exchange Program, the Tanaka Student Research Fund, the Kenneth S. Grossman ’78 Global Studies Fund, and the China Urban Studies Summer Program Endowment Fund. The center also promotes interdisciplinary faculty research by supporting curricular initiatives and projects, organizing and sponsoring events and conferences, publishing working papers and books, and co-sponsoring a variety of arts programming in collaboration with faculty, students, and arts groups based in Hartford and beyond. CUGS also provides a variety of lectures and speakers to Trinity while the school is in session.

CUGS was created in 2007 after a major donation from the Andrew W. Mellon Foundation. Xiangming Chen is the dean and director of the Center for Urban and Global Studies
