= GamCare =

Independent UK charity

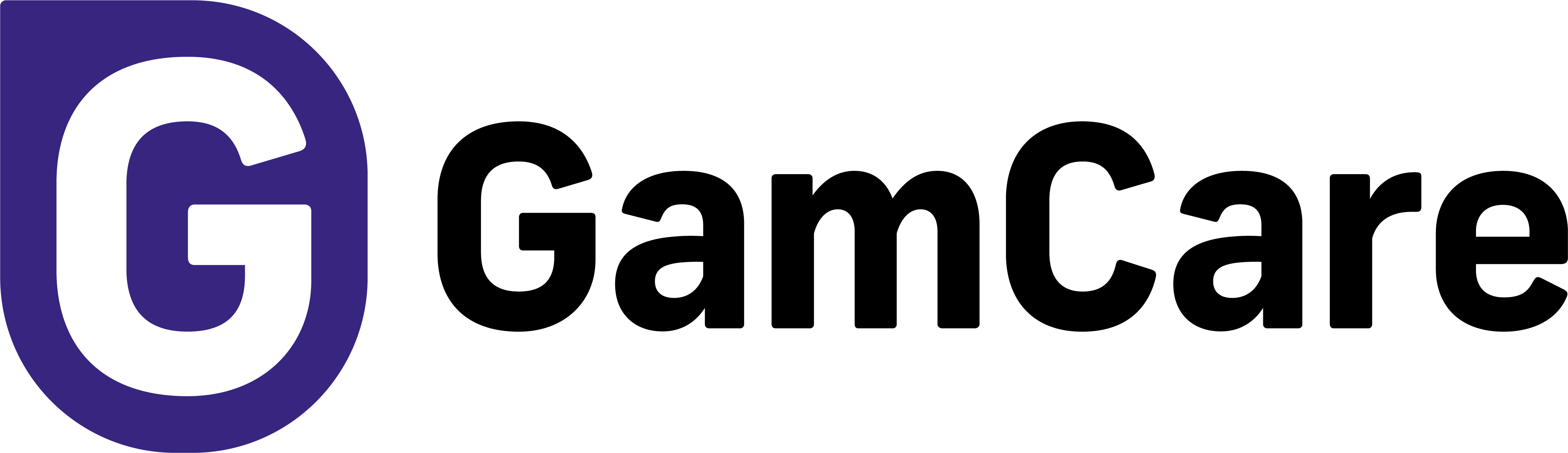
- Type: Charity
- Industry: Gambling, mental health
- Founded: 1997
- Headquarters: United Kingdom
- Key people: Margot Daly, Chair of Trustees
- Revenue: 9,634,800 pound sterling (2020)
- Net income: £20.1 million (2023)
- Number of employees: 92 (2020)
- Website: gamcare.org.uk

GamCare is an independent UK charity founded by Paul Bellringer in 1997 to raise awareness and aid those affected by gambling harms across Britain.

== Overview ==
GamCare is a UK provider of information, advice, and support for individuals affected by gambling harms. Services are provided confidentially and free of charge. GamCare operates the National Gambling Helpline on Freephone and through online channels. GamCare also provides both face-to-face and online support services across England and Scotland.

GamCare also provides training and materials to the gambling industry to improve social responsibility and customer protection. Training programs help attenders learn to recognise the signs of gambling harm and advise them on how to interact with customers to achieve a positive outcome.

== See also ==
- Gamblers Anonymous
- UK Gambling Commission
