= S. Alexandra Burt =

American psychologist and behavior geneticist

- Born: Sybil Alexandra Burt
- Education: Emory University; University of Minnesota
- Known for: Twin studies
- Scientific career
- Fields: Behavior genetics
- Institutions: Michigan State University
- Thesis: The nature of the association between parent-child conflict and childhood externalizing pathology (2004)
- Doctoral advisors: Matthew McGue; William Iacono

Sybil Alexandra Burt is an American psychologist and behavior geneticist. She is professor of psychology at Michigan State University and the co-director of its Michigan State University Twin Registry. She is known for researching the role of genetic factors in parenting and popularity. She has also researched the link between antisocial behavior and marriage, finding that the relationship appears to be bidirectional: in her research, men with fewer antisocial behaviors were more likely to get married, and once they did so, their rates of antisocial behavior decreased even more.
