= Swedish Twin Registry =

Twin registry based at the Karolinska Institutet in Sweden

The Swedish Twin Registry (abbreviated STR) is a twin registry based at the Karolinska Institutet in Stockholm, Sweden. Originally established in the 1960s, it is the largest twin registry in the world. It is widely used for medical research, with about thirty active research projects using data from the study as of 2019. As of 2012, it contained a total of 194,000 twins, 75,000 of whom were of a known zygosity. In principle, it contains records of every twin born in Sweden since 1886.

== History ==
The Swedish Twin Registry was first developed in the late 1950s to study the effects of environmental factors, like alcohol and tobacco, on chronic disease risk while controlling for potential genetic confounding factors. When the registry was first started, researchers contacted every parish in Sweden to obtain records of multiple births between 1886 and 1925. The researchers then used this information to develop a list of potential twins, whose actual twin status was verified in 1959. In 1960 and 1961, a questionnaire asking about demographic and health-related information was sent to all living same-sex twins that had been identified in Sweden at the time. The registry was officially established in 1961. Additional questionnaires were sent out in 1963 and 1967, and select twin pairs also responded to a further questionnaire in 1970. By 1970, it was estimated that the STR had included 95% of all twins born in Sweden from 1886 to 1925. More recently, the STR has obtained records of twin births in Sweden from the country's National Board of Health and Welfare. In 2004, the registry began inviting all identified nine-year-old twins in the country to participate in its Child and Adolescent Twin Study in Sweden (CATSS).

== Cohorts ==
The Swedish Twin Registry initially consisted of three cohorts of twins: those born in 1886–1925, those born in 1926–58, and those born in 1959–90. More recently, STR researchers have contacted and screened twins born from 1959 to 1985. Over 25,000 of these twins were later enrolled in the Study of Twin Adults: Genes and Environment (STAGE), which was the first STR-based study to use an online questionnaire.
