= Minnesota Center for Twin and Family Research =

Twin study conducted at the University of Minnesota

The Minnesota Center for Twin and Family Research (MCTFR) is a series of behavioral genetic longitudinal studies of families with twin or adoptive offspring conducted by researchers at the University of Minnesota. It seeks to identify and characterize the genetic and environmental influences on the development of psychological traits.

Principal investigators include Matt McGue, William Iacono, and Kevin Haroian.

== Cohorts ==
The primary cohorts of participants include the Minnesota Twin Family Study, Sibling Interaction and Behavior Study, Minnesota Twin Registry, and a variety of other cohorts of participants.

=== Minnesota Twin Family Study ===
MTFS is a twin study established in June 1989 with 1300 same-gendered twin pairs age 11 or 17, with an additional cohort of 500 such pairs recruited around 2004. Twins were born between 1972 and 2000. All twins born in Minnesota at that time were eligible to participate using birth registry data. Both identical and fraternal twins share certain aspects of their environment. This allows researchers to estimate the relative impact of environmental and genetic influences on phenotypes. The focus of the MTFS is on behavioral phenotypes, such as academic outcomes, cognitive abilities, personality, and interests; family and social relationships; mental and physical health; physiological measurements. The assessment wave structure and protocol are similar to the Sibling Interaction and Behavior Study (below), allowing the use of complementary twin and adoption designs to address behavioral genetic questions.

=== Minnesota Twin Registry ===
The Minnesota Twin Registry was established in 1983. Its original goal was to establish a registry of all twins born in Minnesota from 1936 to 1955 to be used for psychological research. Recently, it has added twins born between 1961 and 1964. It primarily conducts personality and interests tests with its 8,000+ twin pairs and family members via mail. From this project, it was able to confirm that twins and their families are representative of the population and that a poll of their opinions would be more accurate than polls in the newspaper.

=== Sibling Interaction and Behavior Study ===
The Sibling Interaction and Behavior Study (SIBS) is a study of >600 adoptive and non-adoptive families. The adoption study design allows one to disentangle the environmental and genetic influences on a phenotype, including psychological phenotypes. The assessment wave structure and protocol are similar to the Minnesota Twin Family Study, allowing the use of complementary study designs to answer a given question.

== Other behavioral genetic studies at the University of Minnesota ==
=== Minnesota Study of Twins Reared Apart ===
The Minnesota Study of Twins Reared Apart was a twin study conducted at the University of Minnesota, independent of the Minnesota Center for Twin and Family Research. In 1979, Thomas J. Bouchard began to study twins who were separated at birth and reared in different families. He found that an identical twin reared away from his or her co-twin seems to have about an equal chance of being similar to the co-twin in terms of personality, interests, and attitudes as one who has been reared with his or her co-twin. Bouchard has said that these two twins happened to be unusually alike, while most twins show more differences:

There probably are genetic influences on almost all facets of human behavior, but the emphasis on the idiosyncratic characteristics is misleading. On average, identical twins raised separately are about 50 percent similar – and that defeats the widespread belief that identical twins are carbon copies. Obviously, they are not. Each is a unique individual in his or her own right.

Psychologists now refer to studies such as this as an Adoption Strategy. Partial funding for the study was obtained through a research grant from the Pioneer Fund.
