= Alfred Herrhausen Society =

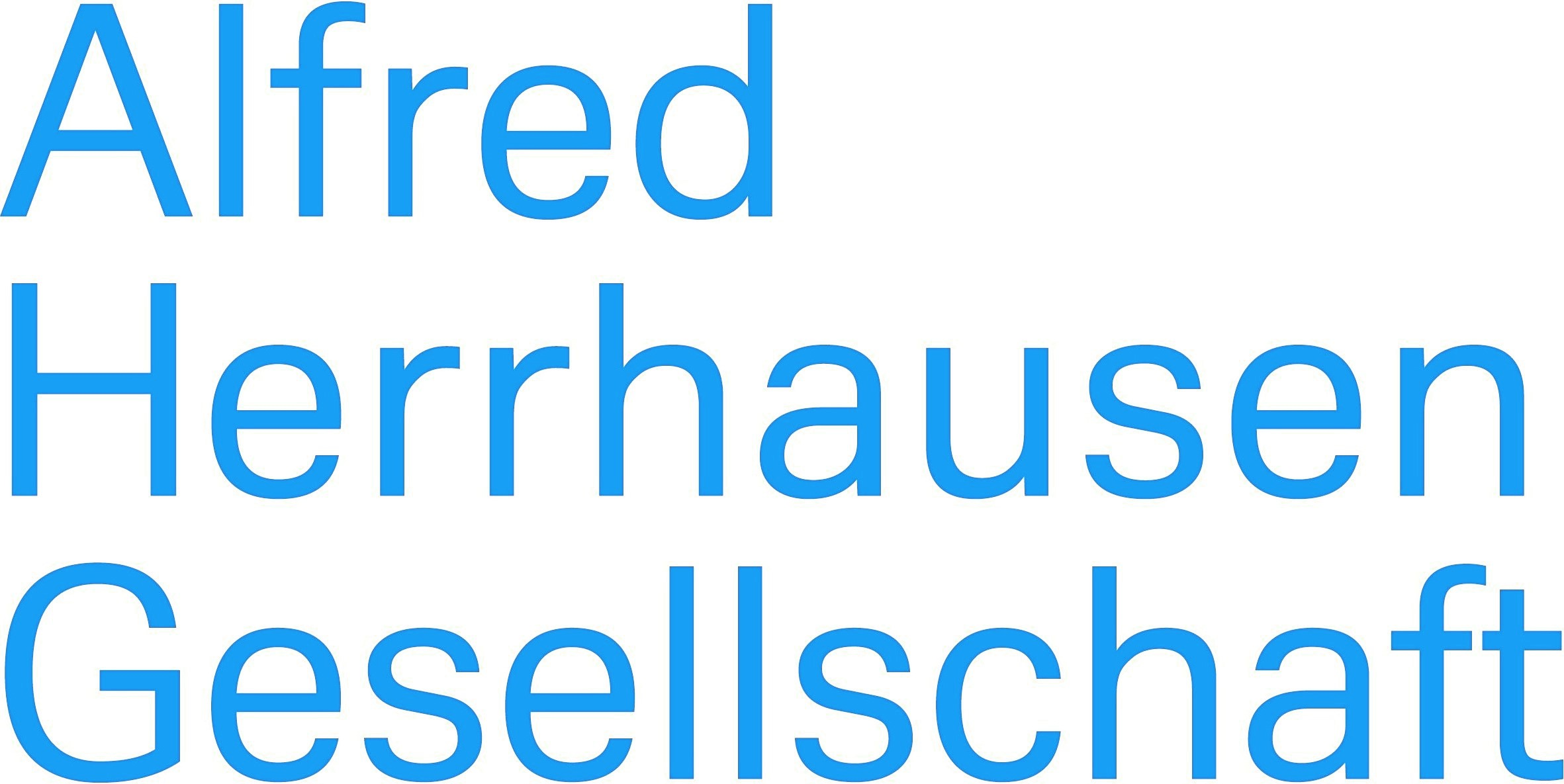
Logo of the Alfred Herrhausen Gesellschaft

The not-for-profit Alfred Herrhausen Gesellschaft mbH (AHG), formally the Alfred Herrhausen Society for International Dialogue is Deutsche Bank's international forum. Founded in 1992, the society is named after the spokesman of Deutsche Bank's board of directors, Alfred Herrhausen, who was assassinated in 1989. It is part of Deutsche Bank's commitment to civil society. Since 2016, Its managing director has been Alfred Herrhausen's daughter Anna Herrhausen.

The work of the Alfred Herrhausen Gesellschaft focuses on the three programs "Cities," "Europe" and "Free Thinking."

The “Cities” programme is characterised by a long-standing collaboration with LSE Cities, an international research center for urban development at the London School of Economics and Political Science. The goal of the Alfred Herrhausen Gesellschaft is to promote the exchange of ideas and the discussion of important issues of the day. It has a network of partner institutions from around the world.
