= Thomas J. Bouchard Jr. =

American geneticist (born 1937)

J. Bouchard Jr.
- Born: October 3, 1937 (age 89); Manchester, New Hampshire, U.S.
- Education: University of California, Berkeley (BA, PhD)
- Known for: Intelligence, Behavior genetics, Personality
- Scientific career
- Fields: Psychology
- Workplaces: University of Minnesota
- Doctoral advisor: Donald MacKinnon, Harrison G. Gough
- Doctoral students: Matt McGue

Thomas J. Bouchard Jr. (born October 3, 1937) is an American psychologist known for his behavioral genetics studies of twins raised apart. He is professor emeritus of psychology and director of the Minnesota Center for Twin and Adoption Research at the University of Minnesota. Bouchard received his PhD from the University of California, Berkeley, in 1966.

== Research ==
Bouchard worked on twin study, particularly as part of the Minnesota Study of Twins Reared Apart (MISTRA). This work has included case studies, longitudinal studies, and large-scale quantitative analyses and meta-analyses. These studies attempt to determine to what degree genes have a role in medical and psychological outcomes, such as personality or heritability of IQ.

One of Bouchard's case studies was Jim Springer and Jim Lewis (so-called Jim twins), twins who had been separated from birth and were reunited at age 39. Bouchard arranged to study the pair, assembling a team and applying for a grant to the Pioneer Fund during 1981. According to The Washington Post, the twins "found they had each married and divorced a woman named Linda and remarried a Betty. They shared interests in mechanical drawing and carpentry; their favorite school subject had been math, their least favorite, spelling. They smoked and drank the same amount and got headaches at the same time of day." According to The New York Times they both also owned a dog named "Toy", and had named their first son almost identically, "James Allan" and "James Alan".

Bouchard has said that these two twins happened to be unusually alike, while most twins show more differences:

"There probably are genetic influences on almost all facets of human behavior, but the emphasis on the idiosyncratic characteristics is misleading. On average, identical twins raised separately are about 50 percent similar -- and that defeats the widespread belief that identical twins are carbon copies. Obviously, they are not. Each is a unique individual in his or her own right.

In 1994, he was one of 52 signatories of Mainstream Science on Intelligence, a public statement written by Linda Gottfredson and published in The Wall Street Journal. This statement was a response to what the authors considered as the inaccurate and misleading reports made by the media regarding academic consensus on the results of intelligence research after the publication of The Bell Curve earlier the same year. The next year, he was part of task force commissioned by the American Psychological Association which released a consensus statement on the state of intelligence research titled Intelligence: Knowns and Unknowns.

Bouchard served as associate editor for the journals Behavior Genetics and Journal of Applied Psychology.

According to Google Scholar, Bouchard has over 300 publications that have been cited over 38,000 times. He has an h-index of 84.

== Awards ==
Awards Bouchard has received include:

- Elected President of the Behavior Genetics Association (BGA) in 1993
- Distinguished Scientist Lecturer of the American Psychological Association in 1995
- Dobzhansky Memorial Award for a Lifetime of Outstanding Scholarship in Behavior Genetics from the BGA in 2001
- The 2005 Kistler Prize
- 2010 Lifetime Achievement Award from the International Society for Intelligence Research.
- Gold Medal for Life Achievement in the Science of Psychology from the American Psychological Foundation in 2014.
- Honorary Degree: Doctor of Science, 313th Convocation, Western University, June 2019

At the occasion of his retirement, a Festschrift was organized in his honor.

== Selected papers ==
According to the Web of Science, Bouchard's five most cited papers are:

1. Neisser U, Boodoo G, Bouchard TJ, Boykin AW, Brody N, Ceci SJ, Halpern DF, Loehlin JC, Perloff R, Sternberg RJ, Urbina S (February 1996). "Intelligence: Knowns and Unknowns" (PDF). The American Psychologist. 51 (2): 77–101. doi:10.1037/0003-066X.51.2.77. (Cited >590 times)
2. Tellegen A, Lykken DT, Bouchard TJ, Wilcox KJ, Segal NL, Rich S (June 1988). "Personality similarity in twins reared apart and together". Journal of Personality and Social Psychology. 54 (6): 1031–1039. doi:10.1037/0022-3514.54.6.1031. PMID 3397862. (Cited >550 times)
3. Bouchard TJ, Lykken DT, McGue M, Segal NL, Tellegen A (October 1990). "Sources of human psychological differences: the Minnesota Study of Twins Reared Apart". Science. 250 (4978): 223–8. Bibcode:1990Sci...250..223B. doi:10.1126/science.2218526. PMID 2218526. S2CID 11794689. (cited >500 times)
4. Bouchard TJ, McGue M (May 1981). "Familial studies of intelligence: a review". Science. 212 (4498): 1055–9. Bibcode:1981Sci...212.1055B. doi:10.1126/science.7195071. PMID 7195071. (Cited >350 times)
5. McGue M, Bouchard TJ (July 1984). "Adjustment of twin data for the effects of age and sex". Behavior Genetics. 14 (4): 325–343. doi:10.1007/BF01080045. PMID 6542356. S2CID 45677867. (Cited >250 times)
