= Andrea Klump =

Convicted far-left terrorist (born 1957)

Andrea Martina Klump (born 13 May 1957) is a convicted far-left terrorist.

== Early life ==
From 1978 to 1981 Klump studied Ethnology, Sociology and Political Science in Frankfurt/Main. In 1984, she went underground. She was the girlfriend of a fellow activist, Horst Ludwig Meyer, who is known to have been member of the Red Army Faction (RAF). Her potential membership of the RAF has never been proven.

== Terrorist activities ==
- In 1988, along with Meyer, Klump attempted to bomb a Spanish disco in Rota which was oft frequented by US servicemen, but the attempt was unsuccessful.
- Around 1989, Klump was thought to have been one of the prime suspects in the assassination of banker Alfred Herrhausen, but this theory was later rejected due to a lack of evidence.
- On December 23, 1991, Klump, again along with Meyer, attempted to murder 33 people, including 29 Soviet Jewish emigrants in Hungary, on behalf of a radical Palestinian group. She planted 25 kg of high explosives in a parked car on the road to a Budapest airport, where a bus carrying her intended victims was to pass by. However the home-made remote control detonator is believed to have been faulty, as the bomb went off a few seconds earlier than planned. Six people were injured in the ensuing explosion (four individuals on the bus and two individuals traveling in a nearby police car), but there were no fatalities.
- On September 15, 1999, Klump and Meyer were approached by police in Vienna, Austria. In the subsequent shoot-out, Meyer was shot dead and Klump was arrested and was then extradited back to Germany.

== Sentencing ==
In court in Germany, Klump confessed to the attempted bombing of the disco in Spain in 1988 and was sentenced to nine years in prison. Other criminal charges at that time, such as involvement in a terrorist organisation, were dropped. Klump only partially confessed to the 1991 Hungary bombing, stating that she was aware of the operation prior to its execution but was not directly involved in it. However police found DNA evidence of Klump's stay in Budapest around the time of the bombing and on 28 September 2004 Klump was sentenced by a High Court in Stuttgart to a further 12 years in prison.

She is currently incarcerated.
