= J. Val Klump =

Jeffrey Val Klump is an American limnologist. He was the first person to reach the deepest spot in Lake Superior, a depth of 1333 feet (733 feet below sea level), the second lowest point in the United States after Iliamna Lake, on July 30, 1985 while aboard the R/V Seward Johnson with the Johnson Sea Link-II submersible. Klump was also the first person to reach to the deepest point in Lake Michigan as part of the same expedition. In 2022, he received the International Association of Great Lakes Research Lifetime Achievement Award, and the Wisconsin Sea Grant Institute Actionable Science Award in 2023. He is currently a professor Emeritus and former Dean of the University of Wisconsin–Milwaukee School of Freshwater Sciences.
