= Annals of Clinical Psychiatry =

- Language: English
- Edited by: Donald W. Black

Publication details
- History: 1997-present
- Publisher: American Academy of Clinical Psychiatrists
- Frequency: Quarterly
- Impact factor: 2.364 (2014)

Standard abbreviations
- ISO 4: Ann. Clin. Psychiatry

Indexing
- ISSN: 1040-1237 (print); 1573-3238 (web)

Links
- Journal homepage

The Annals of Clinical Psychiatry is a psychiatry journal established in 1989 . In 1997 Springer Science+Business Media assumed production . Issues from 2004 to 2008 are available from Portico. Later it was picked up by the American Academy of Clinical Psychiatrists in 2008 and has been their official journal ever since. At present, the editor in chief is Donald W. Black (University of Iowa). According to the Journal Citation Reports, the journal has a 2014 impact factor of 2.364.
