= Sexual orientation and the military of the Netherlands =

In 1974, the Netherlands was the first country to ban discrimination against gays in the military.

== Sheehan controversy ==
On March 18, 2010, after U.S. President Obama announced that he wanted to put an end to the Don't Ask, Don't Tell policy, former U.S. general and high ranking NATO official John Sheehan blamed homosexuals serving in the Dutch military for the fall of Srebrenica to Serb militias in the Bosnian War fifteen years earlier, stating that homosexuals had weakened the Dutch UN battalion charged with protecting the enclave. In the U.S. Senate, Sheehan said that European countries had tried to "socialize" their armed forces by letting people serve in the army too easily, which according to him, left them weakened. He claimed that his opinion was shared by the leadership of the Dutch armed forces, mentioning the name "Hankman Berman", most probably referring to the then chief of the Dutch defence staff, Henk van den Breemen. Dutch authorities dismissed Sheehan's statements as "disgraceful" and "total nonsense". Dutch advocates of gay rights, organized in the Pink Army (foundation) and the Stichting Homosexualiteit en Krijgsmacht ("Foundation Homosexuality and Armed Forces"), announced a libel lawsuit against Sheehan to be filed in California. Eventually, after a categorical denial of the comments by the Dutch general who was misquoted by Sheehan, Sheehan apologized for the comments and repealed his testimony, resulting in the withdrawal of the legal threat.

== See also ==
- Sexual orientation and military service - Netherlands
