= Problem gambling =

Harmful repetitive gambling

Irresponsible gambling
- Other names: Ludopathy, ludomania, irresponsible gambling, degenerate gambling, gambling addiction, compulsive gambling, pathological gambling, gambling disorder
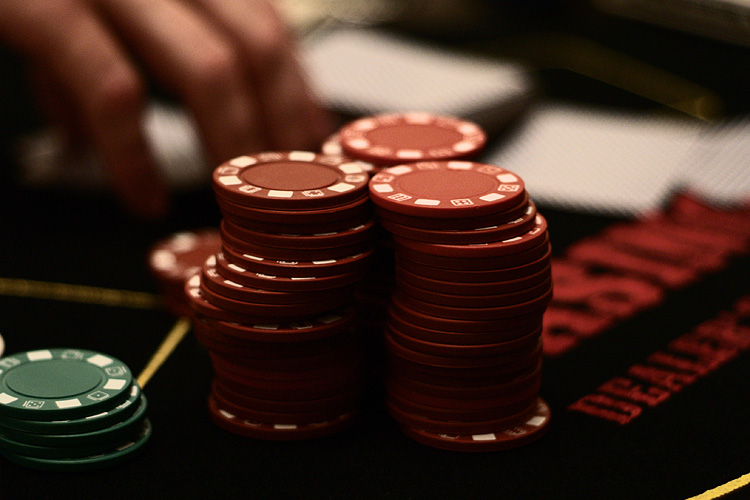
- Specialty: Psychiatry, clinical psychology
- Symptoms: Repetitive gambling behavior despite substantial harm
- Risk factors: Video game addiction

Addiction and dependence glossary
- addiction – a neuropsychological disorder characterized by a persistent and intense urge to use a drug or engage in a behavior that produces natural reward; addictive drug – psychoactive substances that with repeated use are associated with significantly higher rates of substance use disorders, due in large part to the drug's effect on brain reward systems; dependence – an adaptive state associated with a withdrawal syndrome upon cessation of repeated exposure to a stimulus (e.g., drug intake); drug sensitization or reverse tolerance – the escalating effect of a drug resulting from repeated administration at a given dose; drug withdrawal – symptoms that occur upon cessation of repeated drug use; physical dependence – dependence that involves persistent physical–somatic withdrawal symptoms (e.g., delirium tremens and nausea); psychological dependence – dependence that is characterized by emotional-motivational withdrawal symptoms (e.g., anhedonia and anxiety) that affect cognitive functioning.; reinforcing stimuli – stimuli that increase the probability of repeating behaviors paired with them; rewarding stimuli – stimuli that the brain interprets as intrinsically positive and desirable or as something to approach; sensitization – an amplified response to a stimulus resulting from repeated exposure to it; substance use disorder – a condition in which the use of substances leads to clinically and functionally significant impairment or distress; drug tolerance – the diminishing effect of a drug resulting from repeated administration at a given dose

Problem gambling (PG), also known as pathological gambling, gambling disorder, gambling addiction, irresponsible gambling, or ludomania, is repetitive gambling behavior despite harm and negative consequences. Problem gambling may be diagnosed as a mental disorder according to the DSM-5 if certain diagnostic criteria are met. Pathological gambling is a common disorder associated with social and family costs.

The DSM-5 has re-classified the condition as an addictive disorder, with those affected exhibiting many similarities to those with substance use disorder. They both activate a reward mechanism in the brain, causing dopamine release to reinforce repetitive behavior. Both often lead to loss of control.

The term gambling addiction has long been used in the recovery movement. Pathological gambling was long considered by the American Psychiatric Association to be an impulse-control disorder rather than an addiction. However, data suggests a closer relationship between pathological gambling and substance use disorders than exists between PG and obsessive–compulsive disorder (OCD), mainly because the behaviors in problem gambling and most primary substance use disorders (i.e., those not resulting from a desire to "self-medicate" for another condition such as depression) seek to activate the brain's reward mechanisms, while the behaviors characterizing OCD are prompted by overactive and misplaced signals from the brain's fear mechanisms.

Problem gambling is an addictive behavior with a high comorbidity with alcohol problems. A common tendency shared by people who have a gambling addiction is impulsivity.

== Signs and symptoms ==
Research by governments in Australia led to a universal definition for that country which appears to be the only research-based definition not to use diagnostic criteria: "Problem gambling is characterized by many difficulties in limiting money and/or time spent on gambling which leads to adverse consequences for the gambler, others, or for the community." The University of Maryland Medical Center defines pathological gambling as "being unable to resist impulses to gamble, which can lead to severe personal or social consequences".

Most other definitions of problem gambling can usually be simplified to any gambling that causes harm to the gambler or someone else in any way; however, these definitions are usually coupled with descriptions of the type of harm or the use of diagnostic criteria. The DSM-5 has since reclassified pathological gambling as gambling disorder and has listed the disorder under substance-related and addictive disorders rather than impulse-control disorders. This is due to the symptomatology of the disorder resembling an addiction not dissimilar to that of a substance use disorder. To be diagnosed, an individual must have at least four of the following symptoms in 12 months:

- Needs to gamble with increasing amounts of money to achieve the desired excitement
- Is restless or irritable when attempting to cut down or stop gambling
- Has made repeated unsuccessful efforts to control, cut back, or stop gambling
- Is often preoccupied with gambling (e.g., having persistent thoughts of reliving past gambling experiences, handicapping or planning the next venture, thinking of ways to get money with which to gamble)
- Often gambles when feeling distressed (e.g., helpless, guilty, anxious, depressed)
- After losing money gambling, often returns another day to get even ("chasing" one's losses)
- Lies to conceal the extent of involvement with gambling
- Has jeopardized or lost a significant relationship, job, education, or career opportunity because of gambling
- Relies on others to provide money to relieve desperate financial situations caused by gambling

== Risk factors ==
Mayo Clinic specialists and other studies state that compulsive gambling may result from biological, genetic, and environmental factors such as:

- Mental health disorders (the presence of substance use disorders, personality disorders, emotional states)
- Age and sex (usually found in youth or middle-aged people, and more common to men than women)
- Impact of family or friends
- Personality traits
- Video games (including any factors that resemble gambling such as slot machines or loot boxes)
- Drugs with rare side-effects (for example, antipsychotic medications or dopamine agonists).
- Traumatic conditions
- Job-related stress
- Solitude
- Co-occurring disorders (COD)

== Etiology ==
=== Biology ===
Evidence indicates that pathological gambling is an addiction similar to chemical addiction. It has been observed that some pathological gamblers have lower levels of norepinephrine than normal gamblers. New studies regarding this link show that norepinephrine is secreted under stress, arousal, or thrill, so pathological gamblers gamble to make up for their under-dosage. Studies have compared pathological gamblers to substance addicts, concluding that addicted gamblers display more physical symptoms during withdrawal. Deficiencies in serotonin might also contribute to compulsive behavior, including a gambling addiction.

The findings in one review indicated that behavioral disorders such as problem gambling and substance use disorder are closely linked; sensitization theory indicates that these disorders are marked by a compulsive drive towards unhealthy behaviors and an inability to control against them. Dopamine dysregulation syndrome has been observed in the aforementioned theory in people with regard to such activities as gambling. A limited study was presented at a conference in Berlin, suggesting opioid release differs in problem gamblers from the general population, but in a very different way from people with a substance use disorder.

Some medical authors suggest that the biomedical model of problem gambling may be unhelpful because it focuses only on individuals. These authors point out that social factors may be a far more important determinant of gambling behavior than brain chemicals, and they suggest that a social model may be more useful in understanding the issue. For example, an apparent increase in problem gambling in the UK may be better understood as a consequence of changes in legislation which came into force in 2007 and enabled casinos, bookmakers, and online betting sites to advertise on TV and radio for the first time and which eased restrictions on the opening of betting shops and online gambling sites.

There have also been studies that showcase how factors like gender and age can affect how a person is affected by gambling; examples include the probability of addiction being 11% stronger in men than in women, and the fact that the age range of 19–29 has the highest risk of developing problem gambling or pathological gambling habits.

=== Psychology ===
Several psychological mechanisms are thought to be implicated in the development and maintenance of problem gambling. First, reward processing seems to be less developed in problem gamblers. Second, some individuals use problem gambling as an escape from the problems in their lives (an example of negative reinforcement). Third, personality factors such as narcissism, risk-seeking, sensation-seeking, and impulsivity play a role. Fourth, problem gamblers have several cognitive biases, including the illusion of control, unrealistic optimism, overconfidence and the gambler's fallacy (the incorrect belief that a series of random events tends to self-correct so that the absolute frequencies of each of various outcomes balance each other out). Fifth, problem gamblers represent a chronic state of a behavioral spin process, a gambling spin, as described by the criminal spin theory.

Some gamblers often develop learned helplessness—a psychological state in which a person believes they have no control over their situation. This belief is then reinforced through the unpredictable and repeated financial losses that are intrinsic to gambling. This mechanism is significant because it serves to reinforce the cycle of addiction. This phenomenon can shift a gambler's locus of control toward the external. The gambler then begins to perceive outcomes as being determined by uncontrollable external systems, rather than from their own volitional behavior. The theory of learned helplessness was first researched by psychologists Martin Seligman and Steven Maier in the 1960s.

Spain's gambling watchdog has updated its 2019–2020 Responsible Gaming Program, classifying problem gambling as a mental disorder.

==== Similarities to other disorders ====
Pathological gambling is similar to many other impulse-control disorders such as kleptomania. According to evidence from both community- and clinic-based studies, individuals who are pathological gamblers are highly likely to exhibit other psychiatric problems concurrently, including substance use disorders, mood and anxiety disorders, or personality disorders.

Some clinical and population studies suggest that there is a partial overlap in diagnostic criteria between problem gambling and substance use disorders; pathological gamblers are also likely to have a substance use disorder. The "telescoping phenomenon" reflects the rapid development from initial to problematic behavior in women compared with men. This phenomenon was initially described for alcoholism, but it has also been applied to pathological gambling. Also, biological data support a relationship between pathological gambling and substance use disorder. A comprehensive UK Gambling Commission study from 2018 has also hinted at the link between gambling addiction and a reduction in physical activity, poor diet, and overall well-being. The study links problem gambling to a myriad of issues affecting relationships, and social stability.

==== Evolutionary psychology ====
Some researchers propose that human gambling behavior reflects evolved tendencies toward risk-taking that historically conferred adaptive benefits. For example, gambling can be understood as a form of "risky reward-seeking," where individuals overestimate potential gains—an inclination that modern gambling industries exploit. From this view, men tend to gamble more and engage in higher-stakes bets because male reproductive success is often linked to risk-based competition, paralleling other risky activities like big-game hunting or physical aggression. Younger adults may also be more prone to gambling due to the evolutionary advantage of status-seeking during peak reproductive years.

Other evolutionary accounts highlight the role of reward uncertainty. Researchers suggest that unpredictability itself motivates animals (including humans) to persevere in reward-seeking despite repeated failures, which can foster persistent gambling behaviour. Life History Theory further explains why some individuals are more vulnerable to problem gambling, proposing that those with a "fast" strategy (marked by impulsiveness and short-term planning) may be especially drawn to high-risk, high-reward scenarios. In this framework, personality traits favoring present-oriented decision-making increase susceptibility to gambling addiction, mirroring risk-taking behaviors seen in other species.

== Diagnosis ==
A common instrument used to screen for "probable pathological gambling" behavior is the South Oaks Gambling Screen (SOGS) developed by Henry Lesieur and Sheila Blume at the South Oaks Hospital in New York City. In recent years the use of SOGS has declined due to a number of criticisms, including that it overestimates false positives.

The DSM-IV diagnostic criteria, developed by the American Psychiatric Association, is an alternative to SOGS, focusing on the psychological motivations underpinning problem gambling. Presented as a checklist, it consists of ten diagnostic criteria. One frequently used screening measure based upon the DSM-IV criteria is the National Opinion Research Center DSM Screen for Gambling Problems (NODS). The Canadian Problem Gambling Inventory (CPGI) and the Victorian Gambling Screen (VGS) are newer assessment measures. The Problem Gambling Severity Index, which focuses on the harms associated with problem gambling, is composed of nine items from the longer CPGI. The VGS is also harm based and includes 15 items. The VGS has proven validity and reliability in population studies as well as adolescents and clinic gamblers.

== Treatment ==
Most treatment for problem gambling involves counseling, step-based programs, self-help, peer-support, medication, or a combination of these. However, no one treatment is considered to be most efficacious and, in the United States, no medications have been approved for the treatment of pathological gambling by the U.S. Food and Drug Administration (FDA).

Gamblers Anonymous (GA) is a commonly used treatment for gambling problems. Modeled after Alcoholics Anonymous, GA is a twelve-step program that emphasizes a mutual-support approach. There are three in-patient treatment centers in North America. One form of counseling, cognitive behavioral therapy (CBT) has been shown to reduce symptoms and gambling-related urges. This type of therapy focuses on the identification of gambling-related thought processes, mood and cognitive distortions that increase one's vulnerability to out-of-control gambling. Additionally, CBT approaches frequently utilize skill-building techniques geared toward relapse prevention, assertiveness and gambling refusal, problem solving and reinforcement of gambling-inconsistent activities and interests.

As to behavioral treatment, some recent research supports the use of both activity scheduling and desensitization in the treatment of gambling problems. In general, behavior analytic research in this area is growing There is evidence that the SSRI paroxetine is efficacious in the treatment of pathological gambling. Additionally, for patients with both pathological gambling and a comorbid bipolar spectrum condition, sustained-release lithium has shown efficacy in a preliminary trial. The opioid antagonist drug nalmefene has also been trialed quite successfully for the treatment of compulsive gambling. Group concepts based on CBT, such as the metacognitive training for problem gambling have also proven effective.

=== Step-based programs ===
12 Step–based programs such as Gamblers Anonymous are specific to gambling and generic to healing addiction, creating financial health, and improving mental wellness. Commercial alternatives that are designed for clinical intervention, using the best of health science and applied education practices, have been used as patient-centered tools for intervention since 2007. They include measured efficacy and resulting recovery metrics.

=== Motivational interviewing ===
Motivational interviewing is one of the treatments for compulsive gambling. The motivational interviewer's basic goal is promoting readiness to change through thinking and resolving mixed feelings. Avoiding aggressive confrontation, argument, labeling, blaming, and direct persuasion, the interviewer supplies empathy and advice to compulsive gamblers who define their own goal. The focus is on promoting freedom of choice and encouraging confidence in the ability to change.

=== Peer support ===
A growing method of treatment is peer support. With the advancement of online gambling, many gamblers experiencing issues use various online peer-support groups to aid their recovery. This protects their anonymity while allowing them to attempt recovery on their own, often without having to disclose their issues to loved ones.

=== Self-help ===
Research into self-help for problem gamblers has shown benefits. A study by Wendy Slutske of the University of Missouri concluded one-third of pathological gamblers overcome it by natural recovery.

=== Pharmaceutical treatments ===
Numerous pharmaceutical approaches to treating gambling addiction have been suggested including antidepressants, atypical antipsychotic agents, mood stabilizers, and opioid antagonists, however the best approach for treatment, treatment regime including dosage and timing is not clear. There is some evidence to suggest that opioid antagonists, for example, naltrexone or nalmefene, and atypical antipsychotics such as olanzapine, may help reduce the severity of gambling symptoms in the short-term, however it is not clear if these medications are effective at improving other psychological symptoms associated with this disorder or for longer term symptom relief from problem gambling. The evidence suggesting the effectiveness of mood stabilizers is not clear.

A series of anti-depressant studies were conducted to determine their efficacy in treating problematic gambling. These studies produced three critical findings:

1. Antidepressants can reduce pathological gambling when there is an effect on serotonergic reuptake inhibitors and 5-HT_{1}/5-HT_{2} receptor antagonists.
2. Pathological gambling, as part of obsessive–compulsive disorder, requires the higher doses of antidepressants as is usually required for depressive disorders.
3. In cases where participants do not have or have minimal symptoms of anxiety or depression, antidepressants may still have an effect.

=== Self-exclusion ===
Gambling self-exclusion (voluntary exclusion) programs are available in the US, the UK, Canada, Australia, South Africa, France, and other countries. They seem to help some (but not all) problem gamblers to gamble less often.

Some experts maintain that casinos in general arrange for self-exclusion programs as a public relations measure without actually helping many of those with problem gambling issues. A campaign of this type merely "deflects attention away from problematic products and industries", according to Natasha Dow Schull, a cultural anthropologist at New York University and author of the book Addiction by Design.

There is also a question as to the effectiveness of such programs, which can be difficult to enforce. In the province of Ontario, Canada, for example, the Self-Exclusion program operated by the government's Ontario Lottery and Gaming Corporation (OLG) is not effective, according to investigation conducted by the television series, revealed in late 2017: "Gambling addicts ... said that while on the ... self-exclusion list, they entered OLG properties on a regular basis" in spite of the facial recognition technology in place at the casinos, according to the Canadian Broadcasting Corporation. Additionally, a CBC journalist who tested the system found that he was able to enter Ontario casinos and gamble on four distinct occasions, in spite of having been registered and photographed for the self-exclusion program. An OLG spokesman provided this response when questioned by the CBC: "We provide supports to self-excluders by training our staff, by providing disincentives, by providing facial recognition, by providing our security officers to look for players. No one element is going to be foolproof because it is not designed to be foolproof".

=== Impact (Australia) ===
According to the Australian Productivity Commission's final report into gambling, which was produced in 2010, the social cost of problem gambling is close to $4.7 billion a year. Some of the harms resulting from problem gambling include depression, suicide, lower work productivity, job loss, relationship breakdown, crime and bankruptcy. A survey conducted in 2008 found that the most common motivation for fraud was problem gambling, with each incident averaging a loss of $1.1 million. According to Darren R. Christensen. Nicki A. Dowling, Alun C. Jackson and Shane A. Thomas, a survey done from 1994 to 2008 in Tasmania gave results that gambling participation rates have risen rather than fallen over this period.

== Prevalence ==
=== Europe ===
In Europe, the rate of problem gambling is typically 0.5 to 3 percent. The "British Gambling Prevalence Survey 2007", conducted by the British Gambling Commission, found approximately 0.6 percent of the adult population had problem gambling issues—the same percentage as in 1999. The highest prevalence of problem gambling was found among those who participated in spread betting (14.7%), fixed odds betting terminals (11.2%), and betting exchanges (9.8%). In Norway, a December 2007 study showed the amount of current problem gamblers was 0.7 percent.

With gambling addiction on the rise worldwide and across Europe in particular, those calling gambling a disease have been gaining grounds. The British Gambling Commission announced a significant shift in their approach to gambling through their reclassification of gambling as a disease, and therefore that it should be addressed adequately by the NHS.

The World Health Organization has also classified gambling a disease. In its 72nd World Health Assembly held on Saturday, May 25, 2019, 'gaming disorder' was recognized as an official illness. The 194-member meet added excessive gaming to a classified list of diseases as it revised its International Statistical Classification of Diseases and Related Health Problems (ICD-11).

=== North America ===
Lizbeth García Quevedo, director of the Coordination with Federal Entities (CONADIC), spoke of pathological gambling as a strong addiction in Mexico: "It has very similar behaviors, that is why some experts consider it an addiction because it is similar in the behaviors, in the origins, some risk factors that can trigger pathological gambling, it can also trigger drug consumption". In Mexico there could be between one and three million people addicted to gambling. "They should be aware of what their children are doing, and on the other hand, they should motivate pro-active gambling, healthy gambling", commented Lizbeth García Quevedo. The Ministry of Health document highlights that a study on pathological gambling that analyzed 46 studies carried out in Canada, the United States, Australia, Sweden, Norway, England, Switzerland and Spain, revealed that the prevalence of pathological gambling is relatively higher among adolescents, which shows the continuity of the problem considering that many pathological gamblers state that they started their gambling behavior at an early age.

In the United States, the percentage of pathological gamblers was 0.6 percent, and the percentage of problem gamblers was 2.3 percent in 2008. Studies commissioned by the National Gambling Impact Study Commission Act has shown the prevalence rate ranges from 0.1 percent to 0.6 percent. Nevada has the highest percentage of pathological gambling; a 2002 report estimated 2.2 to 3.6 percent of Nevada residents over the age of 18 could be called problem gamblers. Also, 2.7 to 4.3 percent could be called probable pathological gamblers.

According to a 1997 meta-analysis by Harvard Medical School's division on addictions, 1.1 percent of the adult population of the United States and Canada could be called pathological gamblers. A 1996 study estimated 1.2 to 1.9 percent of adults in Canada were pathological. In Ontario, a 2006 report showed 2.6 percent of residents experienced "moderate gambling problems" and 0.8 percent had "severe gambling problems". In Quebec, an estimated 0.8 percent of the adult population were pathological gamblers in 2002. Although most who gamble do so without harm, approximately 6 million American adults are addicted to gambling.

According to a survey of 11th and 12th graders in Wood County, Ohio found that the percentage who reported being unable to control their gambling rose to 8.3 percent in 2022, up from just 4.2 percent in 2018. The reasons for the increase cited, are the time spent online during the COVID-19 pandemic, gambling-like elements put into video games, and the increased legalization of sports betting in a number of U.S. states.

According to Jennifer Trimpey, as the legality of online sport betting and online casino gambling increase across the United States, almost all governments of states with legal online gambling offer state-run self-exclusion programs, and most major online betting operators provide their own self-exclusion programs as well. A 2025 study from the University of California, Los Angeles found that the spread of legal sports betting caused consumers to take on more problematic debt and led to an increase in bankruptcies.

=== South America ===
For Isabel Sánchez Sosa, coordinator of the Compulsive Gamblers Association of Argentina, "gambling addiction is growing a lot in the country because the offer is impressive" and in this sense she asserted that the presence of bingos is a common issue in all neighborhoods. In the province of Buenos Aires there are 46 bingos.

=== Africa ===
Similar to other parts of the world, Africa's gambling rates are increasing, especially among youths. In East African countries like Kenya and Uganda, more than a majority of youths surveyed reported gambling behaviors in the last 12 months. Additionally, many youths begin gambling before the age of 18, which correlates with the psychological etiologies of risk-taking and low self-control. Gambling in East Africa is correlated with substance use, risky sexual behaviors such as unprotected sex and frequent sexual encounters, and risks of crime. Regarding youths who gamble, almost 50% of them report some form of gambling severe enough to be classified as problematic by the DSM.

In Western Africa, such as countries like Nigeria and Ghana, these trends are mirrored. A majority of youths participate in lifetime gambling behaviors, and of those who gamble, over 70% reported consistent gambling within the last year. Gambling in West Africa is linked with problems with law enforcement and other authorities, substance use, and reckless financial spending. Across all areas of Africa, sports betting and card-games serve to be the most prevalent forms of gambling; a supermajority of individuals gamble on weekends in particular. Sports betting is incredibly common among high-schoolers and college-aged individuals and can be seen most often among young men.

=== Asia ===
Gambling in Asia is particularly challenging to study because it is prohibited in a majority of countries. In countries such as China and Japan, the only way to gamble legally is through government-run lotteries or casinos. Regardless of its legality, gambling still occurs in underground networks and through legal loopholes, such as pachinko in Japan. Gambling behaviors are closely connected with homelessness, especially in places such as Osaka City. Among those who live in poverty and experience homelessness, 43.7% of individuals reported as lifetime gamblers. There are a number of risk factors associated with this link; primarily, a long duration of homelessness throughout the life-course and repeated instances of homelessness increase risks of gambling behavior.

Gambling is also closely associated with gaming behaviors, specifically the prevalence of loot boxes. Loot boxes are found within certain games, and they consist of lottery-like in-game merchandising where players can unlock certain items by chance. Loot boxes contain items which are graded by rarity, from common to legendary, and this relationship of rarity to unlock chances closely resembles payouts in certain gambling machines, such as jackpots in slot machines. Jackpots are very high rewards, but the chances of achieving them are very rare; this mimics the rarity of unlocking a legendary item through a loot box. Across 270 studies, there is a significant causal relationship between increasing prevalence of certain gaming behaviors and further risk of gambling addiction.

=== Oceania (Australia) ===
Casinos and poker machines in pubs and clubs facilitate problem gambling in Australia. The building of new hotels and casinos has been described as "one of the most active construction markets in Australia"; for example, AUD$860 million was allocated to rebuild and expand the Star Complex in Sydney.

A 2010 study, conducted in the Northern Territory by researchers from the Australian National University (ANU) and Southern Cross University (SCU), found that the proximity of a person's residence to a gambling venue is significant in terms of prevalence. Harmful gambling in the study was prevalent among those living within 100 meters of any gambling venue, and was over 50% higher than among those living ten kilometers from a venue. The study's data stated:

Specifically, people who lived 100 meters from their favorite venue visited an estimated average of 3.4 times per month. This compared to an average of 2.8 times per month for people living one kilometer away, and 2.2 times per month for people living ten kilometers away.

According to the Productivity Commission's 2016 report into gambling, 0.5% to 1% (80,000 to 160,000) of the Australian adult population had significant problems resulting from gambling. A further 1.4% to 2.1% (230,000 to 350,000) of the Australian adult population experienced moderate risks making them likely to be vulnerable to problem gambling. Estimates show that problem gamblers account for an average of 41% of the total gaming machine spending.

== Long-term health impacts ==
If not treated, problem gambling may cause severe and lasting effects on an individual's life:

- relationship-related issues
- problems with money, bankruptcy
- legal problems, imprisonment
- health problems
- suicide, including suicidal thoughts and attempts

=== Suicide rates ===
A gambler who does not receive treatment for pathological gambling when in a desperation phase may contemplate suicide. Problem gambling is often associated with increased suicidal ideation and attempts compared to the general population.

Early onset of problem gambling may increase the lifetime risk of suicide. Both comorbid substance use and comorbid mental disorders increase the risk of suicide in people with problem gambling. A 2010 Australian hospital study found that 17% of suicidal patients admitted to the Alfred Hospital's emergency department were problem gamblers.

== See also ==
- Gamblers Anonymous
- Gambler's Lament, an ancient poem about gambling
- Gambling Commission (Great Britain)
- GamCare
- Gaming law
- National Council on Problem Gambling (Singapore)
- National Council on Problem Gambling (United States)
- Problem Gambling Foundation of New Zealand
- Video game addiction
