= Vietnam Era Twin Registry =

Twin registry of American veterans of the Vietnam War

The Vietnam Era Twin Registry (abbreviated VET Registry) is a twin registry containing 7,369 male-male twin pairs who served in the United States Armed Forces during the Vietnam War (defined as the period from 1964 to 1975). As of 2013, it is one of the largest national adult twin samples in the United States. All of the twins in the registry were born between 1939 and 1955. Though it was originally formed to study the effects of military service on health, it has since been widely used to study the role of genetics in many specific mental and physical illnesses.

== History ==
The Vietnam Era Twin Registry was constructed by the United States Department of Veterans Affairs (VA) from military records in the 1980s. The registry is also based on two other data sources: a 1987 questionnaire mailed to the registry's members and the VA's computerized databases. Potential twins were identified using an algorithm which aimed to identify pairs of individuals with the same last name, different first names, and similar Social Security Numbers, among other characteristics; twin status was then confirmed by examining military records. The registry was officially created in 1987 and was opened to non-VA investigators in 1988.
