= Gamblers Anonymous =

Support group for recovering compulsive gamblers

- Formation: 1957; 69 years ago
- Founder: Jim Willis
- Founded at: Los Angeles, California, U.S.
- Legal status: Fellowship
- Purpose: Healthcare, community
- Website: Official website

Gamblers Anonymous (GA) is an international fellowship of people who have a compulsive gambling problem. They meet regularly to share their "experiences, strength and hope", so they can help each other solve the problems compulsive gambling has created in their lives, and to help others recover from the addiction of compulsive gambling. The only requirement for membership is a desire to stop gambling, as stated in the GA Combo book page 2.

Gamblers Anonymous uses the term "Compulsive Gambling" instead of "pathological gambling" or "problem gambling" or a "gambling disorder", terms preferred by clinicians and the American Psychiatric Association (APA).

== History ==
Gamblers Anonymous was founded in 1957 by Jim Willis. He was an alcoholic who used his experience in Alcoholics Anonymous as the foundation in forming Gamblers Anonymous into a 12 step program.

Due to favorable publicity by the newspaper columnist and TV commentator Paul Coates of the Los Angeles Mirror, Gamblers Anonymous held its first group meeting on September 13, 1957 in Los Angeles, California. Thirteen people attended the First Gamblers Anonymous meeting.

The organization began in Los Angeles on September 13, 1957. By 2005, there were over 1000 GA groups in the United States, and groups had been established in:

- The United States of America, currently in all 50 states, many with multiple Gamblers Anonymous meetings each day.
- Australia Phillip S the founder of Gamblers Anonymous in Australia, held the first GA meeting in Sydney on November 25, 1961, at the Congregational Church in Surry Hills, with three other compulsive gamblers. Australia then became the second country to successfully establish a GA group in the world. Phillip was a member of Alcoholics Anonymous, which he joined in 1961 prior to starting GA. As of 2005, after Phillip Sydney's death, Australia had 200 GA meetings a week and thousands had achieved abstinence through Gamblers Anonymous Australia.
- United Kingdom Gordon M, The (UK's) Secretary of the Churches' Council of Gambling in 1958, founded Gamblers Anonymous on 10 July 1964 with the help of Henry and Vivian F. During a business trip to the UK, Henry and Vivian F. members of GA in Brooklyn New York, heard Gordon Moody address a meeting on the subject of gambling at the South Croydon Methodist Church. After which Henry F. approached Gordon M and introduced himself as a compulsive gambler and a member of Gamblers Anonymous in the US. Gordon in time learned a great deal from Henry and Vivian, "enough for me to understand – and to be understood" by one seeking help with a gambling problem.
- Japan GA and Gam-Anon started in Japan in 1989. According to the GA Japan Information Center, in September 2010, GA Japan had 115 groups and GAM-ANON had 93 groups, according to the GAM-ANON Japan Information Center. The annual GA Japan National Conference is held in October, while GAM-ANON Japan holds its National Conference every June. Regional GA and GAM-ANON groups also host smaller conferences annually.
- Kenya Jackson O is the founder of Gamblers Anonymous in Nairobi Kenya, and the author of Not A Chance. GA Kenya currently lists three meetings, one in Nairobi, and two in Murang'a.
- Ireland, Scotland, Canada
- Mexico, South Africa, Brazil, Israel, Uganda, Korea and many other locations throughout the world.

Due to the 2020 COVID-19 pandemic, most GA meetings moved to online platforms such as Zoom, GoToMeetings, telephone conference calls, or a combination of these medium. In person gatherings at physical locations were temporarily suspended due to the COVID-19 Task Force Guidelines, and other regulatory guidelines in other countries throughout the globe.

== Symptoms ==
Gamblers Anonymous members use the 20 Questions as a guide to determine whether they are compulsive gamblers. This is not a definitive evaluation, and only the individual with the aid of their doctor can make the determination as to whether they have a compulsive gambling problem.

The American Psychiatric Association's Diagnosis Criteria of a Gambling Disorder lists the need of a compulsive gambler to increase the amount of money bet, borrowing money to cover losses, lying to conceal the extent of one's gambling, "loss of relationships and jobs", and "frequent thoughts of gambling".

The National Center for Responsible Gaming (NCRG) uses the American Psychiatric Association's DSM-5 to describe the symptoms of a gambling disorder, aka compulsive gambling, to be "chasing" losses, inability to stop, cut back or control their gambling. A Gambling disorder is the only non-substance use addiction identified in the American Psychiatric Association's DSM-5.

The Mayo Clinic offers a list of symptoms for compulsive gambling, which include "preoccupation with gambling", "trying to control, cut back or stop", and lying. A compulsive gambler may sell personal property, or engage in illegal activity to finance the gambling addiction.

NOAA lists "Indicators of Compulsive Gambling:", borrowing money, and spending exceedingly long hours gambling. NOAA also lists some of the "Behaviors Observable in the Workplace" of a compulsive gambler.

== Treatment ==
The American Psychiatric Association (APA) suggests counseling can help the compulsive gambler. The APA also offers ""Dos" and "Don'ts" for Partners or Family Members", which include seeking support from GAM-ANON, along with money management strategies.

Gamblers Anonymous offers members a number of suggestions for abstaining from gambling, these include not going near or into a gambling establishment.

== Meetings ==
GA meetings are the core of the fellowship, "Meetings Make It". Participating in GA meetings along with individual psychotherapy, is the preferred form of treatment according to the UCLA gambling studies program. There are a few different meeting formats offered by Gamblers Anonymous:

- "Closed" (also called "Main") meetings are strictly for those who have or think they have a gambling problem;
- "Beginners" (also called "Newcomers") meetings are particularly for people new to GA, those who have been in the program under one year. Here the newcomer is introduced to GA's suggestions on how to refrain from gambling, found page 17 of the combo book. First and foremost Going to lots of meetings in the first 90 days; Staying away from gambling establishments; not associating with people who gamble; getting a sponsor, a more seasoned GA member who can help the newcomer through the first year, and in latter years too; calling other members between meetings; etc...
- "Mixed" meetings, are gatherings of GA and GAM-ANON members only. During these meetings literature from both GA and GAM-ANON's, 12 step fellowships is read, and members from both fellowships share their experience, strength and hope with each other.
- "Open" meetings are open to those whose lives have been affected by gambling: the spouses, family and friends of a compulsive gambler.
- "Step" meetings, in which GA members work specifically on the 12 steps of recovery.
- "Women's" (also known as "Women-Preferred") meetings, are predominantly attend by women.

"Modified closed meetings" are held when a group votes to include health professionals or persons from other 12 step fellowships or guest attending with a newcomer to Gamblers Anonymous.

- Gam-Anon meetings are exclusively for spouses, family, and friends of a compulsive gambler.. The compulsive gambler need not be a member of GA for one to attend Gam-Anon meetings.

== Gam-Anon ==
Gam-Anon is the sister 12 step program of Gamblers Anonymous, modeled after Al-Anon/Alateen for spouses, partners, family and friends of a compulsive gambler, who are suffering from the stresses and problems caused by the compulsive gambler's gambling and behaviors. Gam-Anon worldwide was started in NYC by Ruth Sachar, and her husband Irving Sachar started the NYC chapter of Gambler's Anonymous.

== Incidence rate and evaluation ==
Problem gambling is estimated to occur in 1.6% of the adult population in the United States. GA has a list of twenty questions that can be used to self-diagnose compulsive gambling. The results from their instrument have correlated strongly with other tests that screen for compulsive gambling (e.g. the Total Sensation Seeking Scale, Boredom Susceptibility, Experience Seeking, South Oaks Gambling Screen, and Disinhibition subscales).

== Effectiveness ==
Gamblers Anonymous has been compared with other strategies, such as cognitive-behavioral therapy as efficacy methods of psychotherapies for pathological gambling. Compared to problem gamblers who do not attend GA, GA members tend to have more severe gambling problems, are older, have higher incomes, are less likely to be single, have more years of gambling problems, have larger debts, have more serious family conflicts, and less serious substance use disorders. GA may not be as effective for those who have not had significant gambling problems. GA is effective to prevent "relapses" (inability to remain abstinent from gambling), but not as effective when helping members deal with the consequences of their relapse.

GA spends much of its time and energy counseling members on how to deal with financial and legal problems. GA supports "pressure relief groups" where members take each other to task and encourage them to "get honest" with people in their lives and get their affairs in order. Gamblers who are able to moderate their activity are not likely to continue attending GA meetings. GA members who stopped attending meetings were more likely to consider the sharing at the meetings "meaningless" and were more critical of GA literature. Those who felt particularly elated at their first GA meetings were less likely to continue than those who had a more balanced first impression. GA, therefore, may be most suitable for severe problem gamblers who do not have compounding issues.

== Criticism ==
=== Attrition ===
Less than 8% of those who initially attend GA remain in the program and abstain from gambling for over a year. Program participation and abstinence increase if members are involved in additional therapy, or if one or more of their family members are involved in Gam-Anon or Gam-A-Teen.

=== Gender bias ===
Although the likelihood of attending GA is the same for males and females, GA has been characterized as a predominately male fellowship. The number of female members, however, is increasing and there is an increasing sensitivity within GA to women's attitudes. GA's lack of appeal towards females has been attributed to GA's lack of focus on the principles of spirituality in other twelve-step programs, like Alcoholics Anonymous (AA). A causal link, however, has not been shown. GA is often described as more secularized than AA.

Among problem gamblers, it has been found that women are more focused on interpersonal issues, and that social issues were more likely to cause them to "relapse". Males more frequently discuss "external concerns" such as jobs and legal problems, and are more likely to relapse because of a substance use disorder. Therefore, it does seem plausible that GA's downplaying of spiritual, interpersonal, and psychoemotional issues, inhibits its effectiveness for women.

=== Literature ===
Jim Willis, founder of Gamblers Anonymous (GA), was first a member of Alcoholics Anonymous (AA). GA is modeled after AA's 12-step program. The first 7 pages of GA's 17-page Yellow Book borrow almost exclusively from AA's Big Book. The last page of the yellow book "Gamblers Anonymous" states: “...steps are the basis for the entire GA Program.”

The format of GA's Blue Book (AA's Big Book is also blue) "GA Sharing Recovery Through Gamblers Anonymous" and Red Book "GA a New Beginning" also borrow from AA. GA's Blue Book starts out with a 4-paragraph foreword from a physician. AA's Big Book has a full chapter "The Doctor's Opinion" that sets the stage of the problem of addiction and the medical field's failed attempts at fixing it. The concept of a disease beyond the capability of the medical community – and humans in general – is borne out of AA's professional opinions and sets the stage for the dependence upon the spiritual solution of the 12 Steps.

One of the most important parts of the steps is that they provide a framework for the continuity of the program itself. If for no other reason that this, it's important that the spiritual foundation of and the reason and actions associated with the 12 steps be emphasized for continuing the program is a spiritual act – the act of carrying the message is payback by those who have been freely given the gifts of the program.

They must rely on a power greater than themselves.

The AA Big Book and 12 & 12 are widely used as-is by many non-AA 12-step programs.

== Literature ==
Gamblers Anonymous has several approved books used as standard literature in the group. These are some of the most popular examples:

- Gamblers Anonymous (1994). One day at a time.
- Gamblers Anonymous (1984). Sharing recovery through Gamblers Anonymous. Los Angeles: Gamblers Anonymous. ISBN 0-917839-00-5. OCLC 11614655.
- Gamblers Anonymous (1989). A New Beginning. Los Angeles, California: Gamblers Anonymous. OCLC 21416926.

== Self-exclusion ==
Some states have worked with casinos, and other gambling establishments to institute a "self-exclusion" mechanism, where gambling institutions would be prohibited from issuing credit, cashing a check or marketing to those who have self-excluded themselves from those establishments.
