= Matt McGue =

American behavior geneticist

- Born: Matthew Kerry McGue; Oakland, California, U.S
- Education: University of Minnesota; University of California, Berkeley
- Awards: James Shields Award (2006); Dobzhansky Award (2014)
- Scientific career
- Fields: Psychology; Behavioral genetics
- Workplaces: University of Minnesota; Washington University in St. Louis
- Thesis: Ridge regression: Estimation and Prediction (1981)
- Doctoral advisor: Thomas J. Bouchard, Jr.
- Doctoral students: S. Alexandra Burt, Wendy Johnson, Wendy Slutske,

Matt McGue is an American behavior geneticist and Regents Professor of psychology at the University of Minnesota, where he co-directs the Minnesota Center for Twin and Family Research.

== Career ==
McGue received his B.A. in psychology from the University of California, Berkeley in 1975 and his Ph.D. from the University of Minnesota in 1981. After completing his Ph.D. he was an instructor and later assistant professor at the Washington University School of Medicine until 1985. He returned to the University of Minnesota and eventually became full professor there in 1992.

He was elected president of the Behavior Genetics Association in 2002 and was president of the International Society for Twin Studies from 2008 to 2010.
