= International Center for Responsible Gaming =

US onprofit organization

The International Center for Responsible Gaming (ICRG), formerly known as the National Center for Responsible Gambling (NCRG), is a non-profit organization in the United States dedicated to funding scientific research on gambling addiction. Founded in 1996 as a 501(c)(3) charitable organization, it originally operated under the umbrella of the American Gaming Association, the primary trade group representing the casino industry. ICRG is now an independent entity.

ICRG's mission includes funding scientific research on pathological and youth gambling, with the aim of providing support to individuals dealing with gambling disorders. Additionally, it promotes the implementation of newly discovered research findings to enhance prevention, diagnosis, intervention, and treatment strategies. On January 1, 2020, the organization changed its name to the International Center for Responsible Gambling to reflect its expanded scope beyond the United States.

In the year 2000, the ICRG (formerly NCRG) established the Institute for Research on Pathological Gambling and Related Disorders (IRPGRD). Over the years, ICRG has received substantial financial support, with nearly $40 million committed to its initiatives. As of 2008, the IRPGRD was dependent on casino funding, which was channeled through the NCRG. Critics have questioned the independence of the IRPGRD's research, although IRPGRD executive director Christine Reilly has stated that the institute's contract with the NCRG ensures the industry does not interfere with its work.

Salon.com reported that while NCRG leaders claim to fund independent science, there is concern about the alignment of research findings with casino interests. This alignment has raised questions about how casinos benefit from gambling addiction, even though there is no evidence of tampering with research findings or skewed results.

In 2023, the International Center for Responsible Gaming (ICRG) awarded a grant of $600,000 to the University of Sydney to establish the Centre of Excellence in Gambling Research (CEGR). The CEGR's central mission involves translating empirical research outcomes into practical, evidence-based strategies to prevent and mitigate gambling-related harm.

== Structure ==
ICRG is governed by a board of directors consisting of five board officers and seventeen members. The board includes representatives from the gaming industry, public health officials, and regulatory communities.

Board Officers:

- Chairman – Mark Lipparelli – Founder, Gioco Ventures LLC, Former Chairman, Nevada Gaming Control Board
- Chair Emeritus – Alan M. Feldman – Distinguished Fellow in Responsible Gaming UNLV International Gaming Institute
- President – Arthur Paikowsky – International Center for Responsible Gaming
- President Emeritus – Phil Satre – Non-Executive Chairman of the Board Wynn Resorts
- Secretary and Treasurer – Christine Reilly – Senior Research Director International Center for Responsible Gaming

Bill Miller, President and CEO of the American Gaming Association (AGA); Michael Soll, president of The Innovation Group; Daron Dorsey, executive director of the Association of Gaming Equipment Manufacturers (AGEM); Steven B. Crystal, chairman of the board and president of Automated Cashless Systems, Inc.; Barry Finestone, president and CEO of the Jim Joseph Foundation; and Scott Seligman, a real estate investor and businessman were added to ICRG's governing board in 2022.

== Resources ==
ICRG provides resources aimed at raising public awareness of gambling disorders, by promoting various ideas within the field of gambling research as well as helping deliver resources for those interested in this issue. These resources cater to various stakeholders, including disordered gamblers, treatment providers, the gaming industry, and other organizations. Resources include presentations, speeches, and news about responsible gaming and gambling disorders.

== Educational programs ==
ICRG offers several educational programs for public use:

- Collegegambling.org: A website offering free resources designed to equip students, parents, campus administrators, and student health professionals with tools to address gambling on college campuses across the country.
- EMERGE (Executive, Management & Employee Responsible Gaming Education): An employee training program based on scientific research, tailored for gaming employees at all levels.
- Talking with Children About Gambling: Utilizes research-based guides to assist parents and youth workers in discouraging children from gambling and recognizing potential warning signs of gambling problems and other risky behaviors.
- ICRG Conference on Gambling and Addiction: A conference that brings together clinicians, public policymakers, industry representatives, researchers, and other stakeholders to discuss concerns related to gambling disorder research and responsible gaming.
- The ICRG Webinar Series: Provides year-round educational opportunities focused on addressing and understanding critical issues related to gambling and responsible gaming.
