= Michigan State University Twin Registry =

Registry of twins

The Michigan State University Twin Registry (or MSUTR) is a registry of twins produced by researchers at Michigan State University. The MSUTR has a lifespan perspective focused on understanding risk factors for internalizing and externalizing disorders.

== Projects ==
The principal investigators of the MSUTR are Kelly L. Klump, Ph.D. and S. Alexandra Burt, Ph.D. The MSUTR involves several independent but related projects, each of which is described below:

- Adolescent Twin Study
- Adult Twin Study of Personality and Behavioral Adjustment
- Michigan Twins Project
- Hormones and Behavior Across the Menstrual Cycle
- Twin Study of Emotional and Behavioral Development – Child (TBED-C)

=== Adolescent Twin Study ===
The MSUTR Adolescent Twin Study of Behavioral Adjustment and Development is a study of 206 same-sex male, 312 same-sex female, and 120 opposite-sex twins between the ages of 10 and 16 years old. The primary purpose of the study was to investigate genetic, environmental (e.g., teasing by peers, parent-adolescent relationships), and neurobiological (i.e., gonadal hormones) risk factors for disordered eating, antisocial behavior, mood, attention/hyperactivity problems, and temperament during early adolescence. In particular, this study aimed to understand whether these psychological characteristics are related to gonadal hormone levels during puberty, whether relationships amongst these factors are influenced by genes, and whether gene x environment interactions influence their development.

=== Adult Twin Study of Personality and Behavioral Adjustment ===
The MSUTR Adult Twin Study of Personality and Behavioral Adjustment is a study of 168 same-sex male, 294 same-sex female, and 270 opposite-sex twins between the ages of 18 and 30 years old. The primary purpose of this study was to examine the extent to which genetic and environmental influences on eating pathology, ADHD, depressive symptoms, anxiety, personality characteristics, and substance use differ between men and women in young adulthood.

=== Michigan Twins Project ===
The Michigan Twins Project (MTP) is an ongoing, population-based study of roughly 20,000 same-sex male, same-sex female, and opposite sex twins between the ages of 3 and 25 years old. The primary purpose of this study is to investigate genetic and environmental influences on a range of physical and mental health variables, as well as to compile a database of twin families in Michigan interested in participating in future twin research.

=== Hormones and Behavior Across the Menstrual Cycle ===
The MSUTR study of Hormones and Behavior across the Menstrual Cycle is an ongoing study that will include a total of 590 same-sex female twins between the ages of 16 and 22 years old. This study aims to investigate associations between ovarian hormone levels and several psychological characteristics, including mood, personality, disordered eating, pubertal development, impulsivity and risk taking behaviors. The extent to which genes influence relationships amongst these variables will also be examined.

=== Twin Study of Emotional and Behavioral Development – Child (TBED-C) ===
The MSUTR Child Twin Study is an ongoing study that will ultimately result in a sample of approximately 500 same-sex female twins and 500 same-sex male twins between the ages of 6 and 10 years old. This study aims to examine the ways in which genes and risk experiences (e.g., peer pressure) interact in the development of acting-out behaviors, depressed mood, anxiety, and other problems in childhood.
