= TwinsUK =

UK adult registry of twins

- Founder: Tim Spector
- Established: 1992
- Staff: 50
- Address: St Thomas' Hospital Campus; 3rd & 4th Floor South Wing Block D, Westminster Bridge Road; London SE1 7EH
- Location: London, UK
- Website: www.twinsuk.ac.uk

TwinsUK, also known as TwinsUK Registry, is the biggest UK adult registry of twins in the United Kingdom, ages 16 to 98 to study the genetic and environmental aetiology of age related complex traits and diseases. Established in 1993, it is based at King's College London with an intent of aiding genetic research. The registry is used to connect researchers to volunteers.

It is the largest registry of twin adults in the UK. As of 2013, it hosted information on more than 13,000 volunteer twins, with approximately 50% having completed a baseline comprehensive assessment and more than 70% having completed a detailed health questionnaire. As of 2013, the cohort was predominantly female (83%) and middle-aged or older, with about an equal division of monozygotic (identical) and dizygotic (fraternal) twins.

== See also ==
- Twins Early Development Study
