= Cornelius W. Wickersham =

United States Army Lieutenant general and lawyer

Cornelius Wendell Wickersham
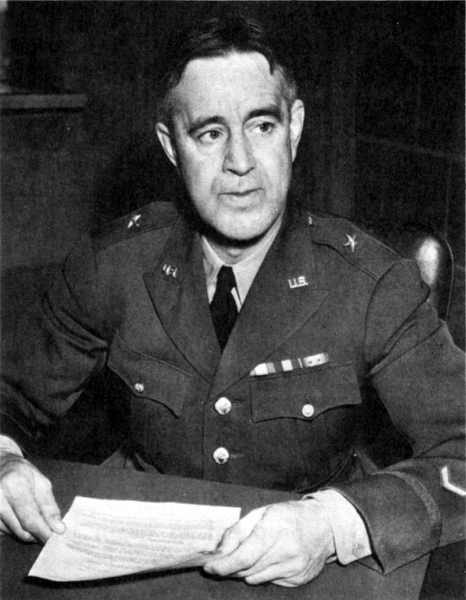
- Cornelius Wendell Wickersham as a brigadier general
- Born: June 25, 1885; Greenwich, Connecticut, U.S.
- Died: January 31, 1968 (aged 82); Mineola, New York, U.S.
- Relatives: George W. Wickersham (father)
- Military career
- Allegiance: United States
- Branch: United States Army
- Service years: 1915–1948
- Rank: Lieutenant General
- Commands: 42nd Infantry Division; U.S. Group Control Council for Germany; School of Military Government; 153rd Infantry Brigade; 306th Infantry Regiment
- Conflicts: Pancho Villa Expedition; World War I: Battle of Saint-Mihiel; Meuse–Argonne offensive; World War II: Operation Torch; Invasion of Sicily
- Awards: Distinguished Service Medal (2); Legion of Merit
- Other work: Lawyer; Governor of the Collectors Club

Cornelius Wendell Wickersham (June 25, 1885 – January 31, 1968) was a decorated United States Army officer with the rank of Lieutenant general; a lawyer and an award-winning author of philatelic literature. He studied at the Harvard University and practiced law for several years, before embarking for France during World War I. Wickersham served as Assistant Chief of Staff for Operations of IV Corps during Battle of Saint-Mihiel and received Army Distinguished Service Medal.

Following the War, Wickersham remained in the New York National Guard, practicing law for next twenty years. He was recalled to active duty in late 1940 and served as first Commandant of the School of Military Government at the University of Virginia. Wickersham was promoted to Brigadier general and served as Commander of U.S. Group Control Council for Germany and received another Army Distinguished Service Medal.

== Early life ==
Cornelius Wendell Wickersham was born on June 25, 1885, in Greenwich, Connecticut. His parents were George W. Wickersham, an American lawyer and future United States Attorney General under President William Howard Taft, and Mildred (Wendell) Wickersham.

In 1906 Wickersham graduated from Harvard University and was admitted to the New York Bar two years later. He obtained his professional degree from Harvard Law School in 1909 and was admitted to the bar of the Supreme Court of the United States in 1912. He also served as Editor of the Law review during that period. Wickersham joined the Cadwalader, Wickersham & Taft in 1914, a law firm in New York City, in which his father was a partner.

=== World War I ===
Wickersham enlisted the Squadron A of New York Cavalry in 1915 and participated as Private in the guarding of the Mexican border. Upon the American entry into World War I in April 1917, he was transferred to 12th New York Infantry Regiment and commissioned first lieutenant. Wickersham quickly rose to the rank of Captain and later was transferred to the headquarters of 27th Infantry Division under Major general John F. O'Ryan. The Division was concentrated at Camp Wadsworth, near Spartanburg, South Carolina, for intensive training and preparation for combat deployment to France. Wickersham assumed duty as Division's Assistant Chief of Staff and supervised the training.

In the spring of 1918, the division began its movement toward embarkation camps and sailed for Brest, France by the beginning of May 1918. Upon arrival to France, Wickersham was promoted to Major and assigned to the staff of IV Corps as Assistant Chief of Staff for Operations under Major general Joseph T. Dickman. While in this capacity, he participated in the preparation and execution of the IV Corps attack during the Battle of Saint-Mihiel in September 1918 and was decorated with Army Distinguished Service Medal for his service.

Wickersham was subsequently promoted to the rank of lieutenant colonel and transferred to the General Staff of the newly created Second United States Army under Lieutenant General Robert Lee Bullard. While in this assignment, he participated in Meuse–Argonne offensive in the final weeks of the war. The Armistice with Germany brought an end to the war on November 11, 1918. Wickersham returned to the United States five months later, in April 1919, almost a year after he left for overseas.

=== Interwar period ===
In the inter-war era, Wickersham commanded 306th Infantry Regiment and the 153rd Infantry Brigade, units of the 77th Division in the Organized Reserve. He served as President of the Joint Conference on Legal Education in the state of New York from 1932 to 1940. Wickersham remained in the New York National Guard and rose through the ranks to Colonel and successively commanded the 306th Infantry Regiment and 153rd Infantry Brigade, both attached to 77th Division under Brigadier general Julius Ochs Adler.

== World War II ==
Wickersham was recalled to active duty in November 1940 and joined to the First Army headquarters at Governors Island, New York City as Assistant Chief of Staff for Intelligence under Lieutenant general Hugh A. Drum. While in this capacity, he held additional duty as Intelligence officer for Eastern Defense Command, which was commanded also by General Drum.

Following the Japanese attack on Pearl Harbor and the United States entry into World War II, Wickersham was promoted to the temporary rank of Brigadier general in January 1942 and assumed duty as Commandant of newly established School of Military Government located at the University of Virginia in Charlottesville, Virginia. While in this capacity, he was subordinated directly to the Provost Marshal General of the Army, Major general Allen W. Gullion and was responsible for training of officers in future detail in connection with Military Government and Liaison. Graduates assisted commanders in foreign fields in their relations with civilians. While in that assignment, Wickersham was also on special duty as an Advisor on Military Government affairs in Africa, Sicily, and Italy. For his service in that assignment, Wickersham was decorated with Legion of Merit.

He was transferred to the European Theater of Operations in January 1944 and assumed duty as Deputy to Lieutenant General Arthur Edward Grassett, Chief of the European Allied Contact Section of the SHAEF under General Dwight D. Eisenhower.

Wickersham was appointed Commander of U.S. Group Control Council for Germany in August 1944 and remained in that assignment until the end of War. His new command was established by the US government as a liaison group within the European Advisory Commission for planning the future occupation of Germany. For his service in this capacity, Wickersham received his second Army Distinguished Service Medal and also received decorations from Great Britain, France, and Poland.

== Postwar career ==
=== New York National Guard ===
Following the surrender of Germany on May 8, 1945, Wickersham moved his headquarters to Berlin and assumed additional duty as an assistant to Lieutenant General Lucius D. Clay, Deputy Military-Governor of the American Zone of Occupation Germany. He was ordered back to the United States in September that year and later joined the headquarters of 42nd Infantry Division under Major General Harry J. Collins.

Wickersham was transferred to the inactive list and succeeded Collins in early 1946, when division was deactivated and reorganized as a New York Army National Guard formation. He was promoted to major general in the National Guard and as an experienced infantry officer, he urged universal military training in short periods that would not break up schooling of young recruits in order to keep his division prepared for national emergency.

=== Law practice ===
By the end of June 1948, Wickersham requested to be relieved of all National Guard duties because of the increasing demand of his private business and was succeeded as division commander by Brendan A. Burns. He was promoted to the rank of lieutenant general on the state's reserve list.

Wickersham then resumed the practice of law in firm Cadwalader, Wickersham & Taft and also served as counsel for Grand Jury Association of New York county and member emeritus of the American Law Institute. He was a founder of the American Legion and was its first department commander for New York. In February 1953, Wickersham was elected a member of the State Board of Regents, the governing body of the University of the State of New York. He resigned in 1955, because of the statutory age limit of 70 years for board membership.

He was meanwhile appointed again the President of the Joint Conference on Legal Education in the state of New York in 1954 and served in this capacity until 1958.

=== Philately ===
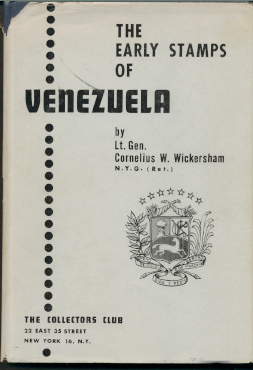
Book jacket of Wickersham Early Stamps of Venezuela

Wickersham was an avid collector of postage stamps and thanks to his collection of stamps of Venezuela, he published The Early Stamps of Venezuela in 1956. He wrote articles about other countries at well in philatelic publications. Wickersham was awarded the Lichtenstein Medal, which is given to a living individual for outstanding service to philately, by the Collectors Club of New York in 1959.

He also served as Governor of the Collectors Club, and was its president in 1956. Wickersham presided the Jury of the 1956 New York City international exhibition.

=== Death ===
Wickersham died on January 31, 1968, aged 82, following a lengthy illness in Nassau Hospital in Mineola, New York. Wickersham is buried at Memorial Cemetery of Saint John's Church in Laurel Hollow, New York.

== Honors and awards ==
Here is the ribbon bar of Lieutenant General Wickersham:

1st Row	Army Distinguished Service Medal with one Oak Leaf Cluster			
2nd Row	Legion of Merit	Mexican Border Service Medal	World War I Victory Medal with two battle clasps	American Defense Service Medal
3rd Row	American Campaign Medal	European-African-Middle Eastern Campaign Medal with four service stars	World War II Victory Medal	Army of Occupation Medal
4th Row	Commander of the Order of the British Empire (United Kingdom)	Officer of the Legion of Honour (France)	Commander of the Order of Polonia Restituta (Poland)	Verdun commemorative Medal

For his work in the field of philately, Wickersham was provided the following award:

- The Lichtenstein Medal in 1959.
