= HEAS =

HEAS may refer to:

- Hebrew Emigrant Aid Society, an organization that ran shelters for recent Jewish immigrants
- Hebrew Immigrant Aid Society (HIAS)
- High Energy Amateur Science
