= George W. Wickersham =

American lawyer and 47th Attorney General (1858–1936)

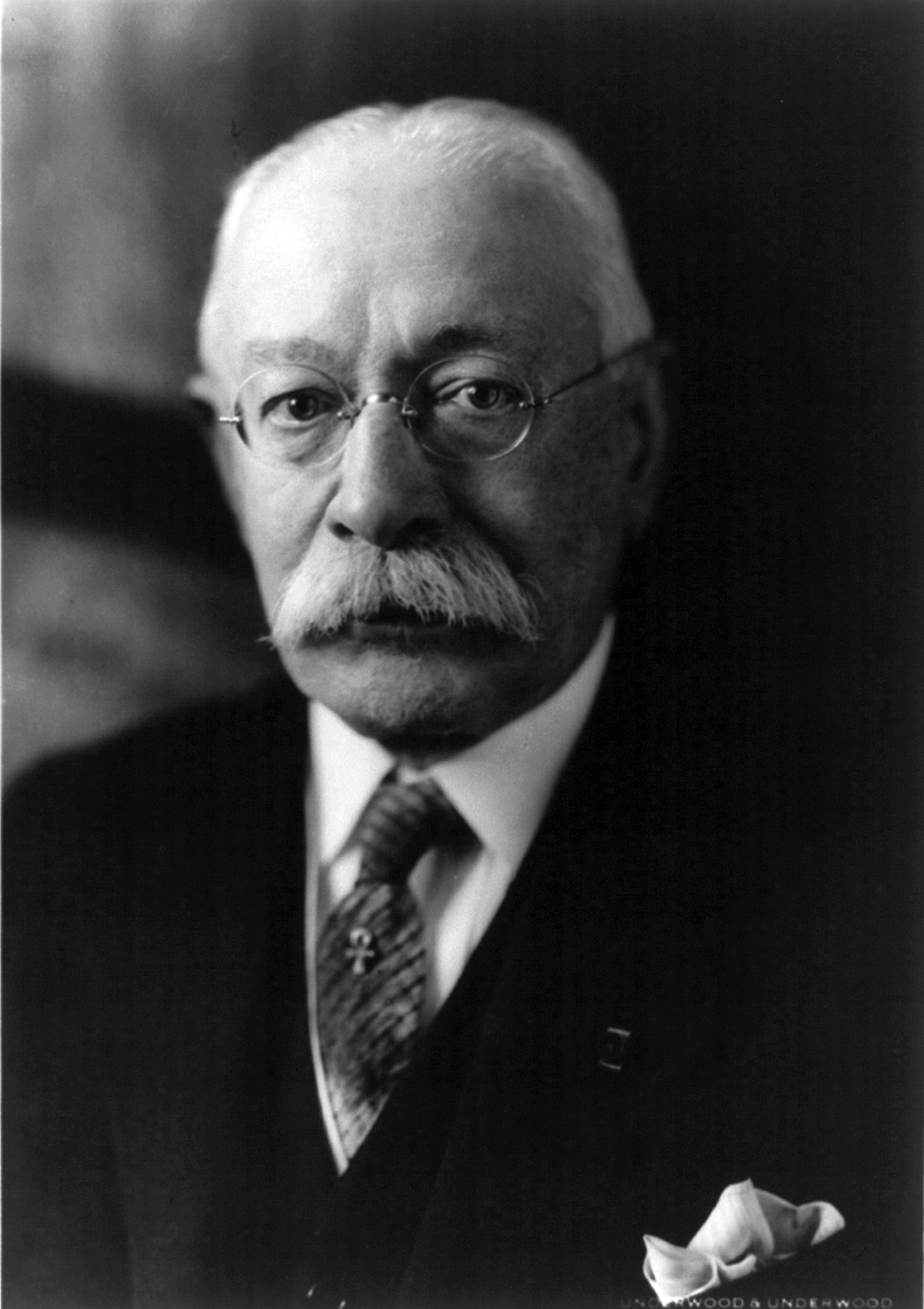
- Wickersham in 1929

47th United States Attorney General
- In office March 4, 1909 – March 4, 1913
- President: William Howard Taft
- Preceded by: Charles Bonaparte
- Succeeded by: James McReynolds

Personal details
- Born: George Woodward Wickersham; September 19, 1858 Pittsburgh, Pennsylvania, U.S.
- Died: January 25, 1936 (aged 77) New York City, New York, U.S.
- Party: Republican
- Spouse: Mildred Wendell
- Education: University of Pennsylvania Law School (LLB)
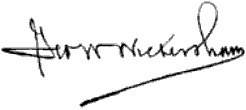
- Signature

George Woodward Wickersham (September 19, 1858 – January 25, 1936) was an American lawyer and Attorney General of the United States in the administration of President William H. Taft. He returned to government to serve in appointed positions under both Republican and Democratic administrations, for Woodrow Wilson and Herbert Hoover. He was President of the Council on Foreign Relations for the latter.

== Background ==
Born in Pittsburgh, Pennsylvania, in 1858, Wickersham attended local schools and graduated from the University of Pennsylvania Law School in 1880 but had previously been admitted to practice before the courts as he studied law by "reading," and preparing through an apprenticeship with an established firm.

He married Mildred Wendell. Their son, Cornelius Wendell Wickersham, was an attorney, author, and military officer who attained the rank of major general in the New York Army National Guard and was promoted to lieutenant general on the retired list to commend his many years of service to the organization.

== Career ==
After several years of practice, in 1883 Wickersham entered the longtime law firm of Strong and Cadwalader in New York City. He became a partner four years later, and the firm was eventually named Cadwalader, Wickersham & Taft.

He was appointed to the office of Attorney General of the United States from 1909 to 1913, in the administration of President William Howard Taft. In 1912 Wickersham supported the membership of U.S. Assistant Attorney General William H. Lewis in the American Bar Association, after Southerners protested the African American's presence and the executive committee voted to oust him. Wickersham sent a letter to all 4,700 members urging their support for Lewis, who refused to resign.

After the election of President Woodrow Wilson in 1912, the Democrat appointed his own people to federal positions. During Wilson's first term, from 1914 to 1916, Wickersham was out of government and served as president of the Association of the Bar of the City of New York. In 1916, Wickersham opposed Wilson's nomination of Louis Brandeis for the Supreme Court, describing the Jewish nominee's supporters as "a bunch of Hebrew uplifters."

Soon after the United States entered World War I in 1917, Wickersham was named by President Wilson to serve on the War Trade Board to Cuba.

In 1929, President Herbert Hoover appointed Wickersham to the National Commission on Law Observance and Enforcement, better known as the "Wickersham Commission." (It was described as the "Wickersham Committee" by William L. Marbury Jr. in a 1935 letter seeking the support of U.S. Senator George L. P. Radcliffe for appointment of Alger Hiss to the U.S. Solicitor General's office; Hiss had served on the committee 1929–1930.)

Wickersham did not return to government under Democratic President Franklin D. Roosevelt. He was elected president of a private organization the Council on Foreign Relations, serving from 1933 to 1936.

== Personal life and death ==
Wickersham married; his son was Cornelius Wendell Wickersham, a lawyer and a U.S. Army Brigadier General.

He lived much of his life in Cedarhurst, New York in the Town of Hempstead, now known as the Village of Lawrence.

Wickersham died in New York City in 1936 and was buried in Brookside Cemetery in Englewood, New Jersey.

== Legacy ==
Since 1996, the Friends of the Law Library of the Library of Congress have presented an annual award named for Wickersham.

Legal offices
Preceded by Charles J. Bonaparte	U.S. Attorney General; Served under: William Howard Taft; March 4, 1909–March 4, 1913	Succeeded by James C. McReynolds
