= Jeffrey Brenner =

American physician

- Education: B.S. (1990) Vassar College; M.D. (1995) Robert Wood Johnson Medical School
- Occupations: CEO; Jewish Board of Family and Children's Services
- Medical career
- Awards: MacArthur Fellowship (2013)

Jeffrey Brenner is the CEO of the Jewish Board of Family and Children's Services, and a primary care physician.

== Biography ==
Brenner is the founder of the Camden Coalition of Healthcare Providers, and was its executive director from 2006 to 2017. The Camden Coalition provides preventive care to high-risk patients in order to reduce healthcare costs. This practice is known as "hotspotting". The program, which began in Camden, New Jersey, has since expanded to ten cities, including Allentown, Pennsylvania, Aurora, Colorado, Kansas City, Missouri, and San Diego.

Brenner won a MacArthur Award in 2013. He left his role as executive director of the Camden Coalition in 2017 to join UnitedHealthcare as Senior Vice President of Integrated Health and Social Services.

Brenner and his notable discovery of medical hotspots in impoverished communities in Camden, New Jersey, was featured in an episode of PBS Frontline called "The Pot Republic," in episode 12 of the 2011 season.

He became the CEO of the Jewish Board of Family and Children's Services in 2021.
