= Three Identical Strangers =

2018 documentary film directed by Tim Wardle

- Theatrical release poster
- Directed by: Tim Wardle
- Produced by: Becky Read; Grace Hughes-Hallett
- Starring: Edward Galland; David Kellman; Robert Shafran
- Cinematography: Tim Cragg
- Edited by: Michael Harte
- Music by: Paul Saunderson
- Production companies: CNN Films; Channel 4 Television; Raw TV
- Distributed by: Neon (North America); Dogwoof (United Kingdom and Ireland)
- Release dates: January 19, 2018 (Sundance); June 29, 2018 (United States)
- Running time: 96 minutes
- Countries: United States; United Kingdom
- Language: English
- Budget: $1–4 million
- Box office: $12.3 million

Three Identical Strangers is a 2018 documentary film, directed by Tim Wardle, about the lives of Edward Galland, David Kellman, and Robert Shafran, a set of identical-triplet brothers adopted as infants by separate families. Combining archival footage, re-enacted scenes, and present-day interviews, it recounts how the brothers discovered one another by chance in New York in 1980 at age 19, their public and private lives in the years that followed, and their eventual discovery that their adoption had been part of an undisclosed scientific "nature versus nurture" study of the development of genetically identical siblings raised in differing socioeconomic circumstances.

The film premiered at the 2018 Sundance Film Festival, where it won the U.S. Documentary Special Jury Award for Storytelling. It was nominated for Best Documentary at the 72nd British Academy Film Awards, and was also on the short list of 15 films (out of 166 candidates) considered for nomination for Best Documentary Feature at the 91st Academy Awards, though it was not selected as one of the final five nominees for the award.

== Synopsis ==
The film describes how Robert Shafran discovered he had a twin brother after he arrived on the campus of Sullivan County Community College in upstate New York in 1980 and was constantly greeted by students and staff who incorrectly recognized him as Eddy Galland. The two met that evening, realized both were adopted, and quickly concluded they were twins. Months later, the publicity surrounding this human interest story reached David Kellman, whose resemblance and matching adoption circumstances indicated that the three were identical triplets.

The brothers found themselves to be alike in many ways beyond their appearance: they had the same taste in food, smoked the same brand of cigarettes, wrestled in high school, and showed signs of separation anxiety as children. They quickly became a minor media sensation, appeared on talk shows such as The Phil Donahue Show, and celebrated their newfound brotherhood, moving in together and opening a restaurant called Triplets, which they operated together.

Each boy was involved as a child in a study by psychiatrists Peter B. Neubauer and Viola W. Bernard, under the auspices of the Jewish Board of Guardians, which involved periodic home visits and evaluations, the true intent of which never was explained to the adoptive parents. Following the discovery that the boys were triplets, the parents sought more information from the Louise Wise adoption agency, which said that it separated the boys because of the difficulty of placing triplets in one household. Upon further investigation, however, it was revealed that the infants had been intentionally separated and placed with families with different parenting styles and economic levels—one blue-collar, one middle-class, and one affluent—as an experiment on human subjects. During the film, the siblings ask if perhaps they and other sets of twins involved in the study were chosen because their parents reported signs of mental illness before having children, but one researcher interviewed denies this flatly, saying the research was simply about parenting.

Over time, differences among the triplets became apparent, and their relationships became strained, especially due to the stress of running their restaurant. All three struggled with mental health problems in their youth, and Galland, who was diagnosed with manic depressive disorder, died by suicide in 1995.

The results of the experiment were never published, and the records will remain sealed until 2066. However, at the end of the film, onscreen text explains that Kellman and Shafran were granted access to the files, though they are heavily redacted and contain no formal conclusions.

== Production ==
Co-producer Grace Hughes-Hallett pitched the idea for the film in 2013 to Raw TV, and was the original director of the documentary. Of her removal from the position, Hughes-Hallett has said "I started Three Identical Strangers as the director. In 2025, I hope I would have remained the director, but it was a while ago and I was a young woman. That is the truth of it. I’ll leave that there. Any young female filmmaker can probably relate."

== Reception ==
On the review aggregator website Rotten Tomatoes, 96% of 190 critics' reviews of the film are positive, with an average rating of 8.2/10; the site's "critics consensus" reads: "Surreal and surprising, Three Identical Strangers effectively questions the nature of reality and identity." On Metacritic, the film has a weighted average score of 81 out of 100 based on reviews from 30 critics, indicating "universal acclaim".

== Related works ==
The unpublished Neubauer twin experiment was first publicized in a 1995 article in The New Yorker by investigative journalist Lawrence Wright, who is interviewed in the film. The study was subsequently the subject of Identical Strangers, a 2007 memoir by separated identical twins Elyse Schein and Paula Bernstein (who appear in the film), as well as the 2017 documentary The Twinning Reaction and a 2018 episode of the American TV news program 20/20 titled "Secret Siblings".

Raw TV, Film4 Productions, and Sidney Kimmel Entertainment said in 2018 that they were jointly developing a dramatic feature film based on Three Identical Strangers, with director Tim Wardle as an executive producer on the project.

== See also ==
- 2018 in film
- List of documentary films
