= Grace Hughes-Hallett =

British documentary filmmaker and podcaster (born 1986)

Grace Hughes-Hallett (b. 1986) is a British documentary filmmaker and podcaster. She has won the Special Jury Award at the Sundance Film Festival and a Grierson Award, been nominated for a BAFTA, and a Primetime Emmy and shortlisted for Best Documentary Feature at the Academy Awards.

== Life ==
Hughes-Hallett is the daughter of Thomas Hughes-Hallett and Jules (Juliet) Hughes-Hallett (nee Rugge-Price). She has two brothers, Archie and Arthur, and a sister, Emily, who died in infancy. She attended St Paul's Girls' School in London, leaving in 2005; she studied at Corpus Christi College, Cambridge University. Hughes-Hallett is married to Daniel Susskind, an economist. The couple have three children.

== Work ==
Hughes-Hallett has worked in documentary filmmaking variously as cinematographer, director, producer and writer.

Hughes-Hallett pitched the idea for the 2018 award-winning documentary film Three Identical Strangers in 2013 to Raw TV, and was the original director of the documentary. She co-produced the film along with Becky Read. The film premiered at the 2018 Sundance Film Festival, where it won the U.S. Documentary Special Jury Award for Storytelling. It was nominated for Best Documentary at the 72nd British Academy Film Awards, and was also on the short list of 15 films (out of 166 candidates) considered for nomination for Best Documentary Feature at the 91st Academy Awards, though it was not selected as one of the final five nominees for the award.

Hughes-Hallett directed the 2025 documentary film The Secret of Me, which premiered at the 2025 Sundance Film Festival. In May 2025 The Secret of Me won the Out in the Silence Award at the Frameline Film Festival.

Hughes-Hallett is the host of Dangerous Memories, a documentary podcast series with Tortoise Media. It was ranked at no. 5 in a list of the 20 best podcasts of 2024 by The Guardian.

== Selected filmography ==
Date	Title	Type	Contribution
2025	The Secret of Me	Documentary	Director
2021	The Princes and the Press	Documentary (BBC2, 2 episodes)	Producer and Director
2018	Three Identical Strangers	Documentary	Producer (original Director, replaced)
2017	Extreme Wives with Kate Humble (Episode 2: Israel)	Documentary (BBC)	Producer and Director
2017	Diabulimia: The World's Most Dangerous Eating Disorder	Documentary (BBC)	Director and Cinematographer
2016	Drugs Map of Britain. Alcohol: Britain's Most Harmful Drug	Documentary (BBC)	Producer and Director
2016	Louis Theroux: A Different Brain	Documentary (BBC)	Assistant Producer
2016	Louis Theroux: Drinking to Oblivion	Documentary (BBC)	Assistant Producer (as Grace Hughes-Hallet)
2016	The Cost of Cute: The Dark Side of the Puppy Trade	Documentary short (BBC)	Producer, Director and Cinematographer
2012	The Dark Matter of Love	Documentary (BBC)	Producer (as Grace Hughes-Hallet)
