= 306th Infantry Regiment =

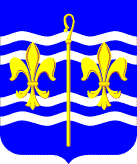
- Regimental Coat of Arms
- Active: 1917–1919; 1921–1946; 1946–1963; 1999- present
- Country: USA
- Branch: U.S. Army
- Role: Infantry
- Size: Regiment
- Part of: 188th Infantry Brigade
- Garrison/HQ: Fort Stewart, Georgia
- Anniversaries: Constituted 5 August 1917 in the National Army
- Decorations: Philippine Presidential Unit Citation; Presidential Unit Citation; Army Superior Unit Award
- Battle honours: World War I World War II

Commanders
- Notable commanders: George Vidmer; Julius Ochs Adler; Cornelius W. Wickersham

The 306th Infantry Regiment was a National Army unit first organized for service in World War I as part of the 77th Infantry Division in Europe. It later served in the Pacific Theater during World War II. Since then it has served as a training Regiment. In 1999, it was withdrawn from the Combat Arms Regimental System and redesignated as a non-branch regiment. The regiment's 1st, 2nd, 4th, and 5th battalions are stationed at Fort Stewart under the command of the 188th Infantry Brigade. The 3rd Battalion is inactive.

== History ==
=== World War I ===
The Regiment was constituted 5 August 1917 in the National Army as the 306th Infantry and assigned to the 153rd Infantry Brigade of the 77th Division. It was organized at Camp Upton, New York on 29 August 1917. The regiment participated in the following campaigns: Oise-Aisne, Meuse-Argonne, Champagne, and Lorraine. The regiment demobilized at Camp Upton on 9 May 1919.

=== Between the Wars ===
The regiment was reconstituted in the Organized Reserve on 24 June 1921, assigned to the 77th Division, and allotted to the Second Corps Area. The regiment was initiated on 9 August 1921 with the regimental headquarters and 3rd Battalion at Flushing, Queens, New York, and the 1st and 2nd Battalions at Brooklyn, New York. The 306th conducted summer training most years with the 1st Division's 16th and 18th Infantry Regiments at Camp Dix, New Jersey, or Fort Slocum, New York, and some years with the 1st Division's 26th Infantry at Plattsburg Barracks, New York. The regiment also conducted infantry Citizens Military Training Camps some years at Camp Dix and Plattsburg Barracks as an alternate form of summer training. The primary ROTC "feeder" schools for new Reserve lieutenants for the regiment were the College of the City of New York and New York University. The designated mobilization training station for the regiment was Camp Dix.

=== World War II ===
Ordered into active military service 25 March 1942 and reorganized at Fort Jackson, South Carolina. The regiment participated in the January 1943 Louisiana Maneuvers. In July 1943, the regiment was organized with 3,256 officers and enlisted men:

- Headquarters & Headquarters Company- 111
  - Service Company- 114
  - Anti-Tank Company- 165 (M1 gun)
  - Cannon Company- 118 (M3 howitzer)
  - Medical Detachment- 135
- Infantry Battalion (x3)- 871
  - Headquarters & Headquarters Company- 126
  - Rifle Company (x3)- 193 (M1 carbine, M1 Garand, M1903 Springfield, M3 submachine gun, M1919 Browning machine gun, M9 Rocket Launcher, M2 mortar)
  - Weapons Company- 156 (M1 mortar, M2 machine gun)

The regiment departed San Francisco on 23 March 1944 and arrived in Hawaii on 1 April. The 306th first saw combat during the liberation of Guam in July, 1944. The 306th served in the liberation of the Philippines, arriving on 23 November 1944. The regiment fought on Okinawa from 27 April though 27 June.

=== Post War Service ===
Activated 17 December 1946 in the Organized Reserves with headquarters in New York City. In May 1959 the regiment was reorganized as a parent regiment under the Combat Arms Regimental System to consist of the 1st Battle Group, an element of the 77th Infantry Division under the Pentomic division design. After adoption of the ROAD program, the regiment was reorganized on 26 March 1963 to consist of the 1st and 2d Battalions, subordinate elements of the 77th Infantry Division. The 1st and 2d Battalions were inactivated 30 December 1965 and relieved from assignment to the 77th Infantry Division.

=== Under the 87th Training Division ===
The 307th Infantry was withdrawn 17 October 1999 from the Combat Arms Regimental System, redesignated as the 307th Regiment, and reorganized to consist of the 1st, 2d, and 3d Battalions, elements of the 87th Division (Training Support). The 1st, 2d, and 3d Battalions were concurrently allotted to the Regular Army.

=== Transfer to First Army ===
On 15 December 2007, the battalions were relieved from their assignment to the 87th Division and reassigned to First Army's 188th Infantry Brigade. In October 2012, 3rd Battalion was inactivated. In 2016, the 4th and 5th Battalions were activated at Fort Stewart.

== Lineage and honors ==
=== Campaign participation credit ===
Conflict	Streamer	Year(s)
World War I	Oise-Aisne	1917
World War I	Meuse-Argonne	1917
World War I	Champagne	1918
World War I	Lorraine	1918
World War II	Western Pacific	
World War II	Leyte (with Arrowhead)	1944
World War II	Ryukyus(with Arrowhead)	1945

=== Decorations ===
Ribbon	Award	Element	Inscription	Orders
	Presidential Unit Citation	1st Battalion	Ie Shima	War Department General Orders
	Presidential Unit Citation	3rd Battalion	Okinawa	War Department General Orders
	Philippine Republic Presidential Unit Citation	Entire Regiment	17 OCTOBER 1944 TO 4 JULY 1945	War Department General Orders
	Army Superior Unit Award	1st & 2nd Battalions	2008–2011	Permanent Orders 332-07 announcing award of the Army Superior Unit award
