= Peter B. Neubauer =

American psychiatrist and psychoanalyst (1913–2008)

- Born: July 5, 1913; Krems an der Donau, Austria
- Died: February 15, 2008 (aged 94); New York City, United States
- Education: University of Vienna, University of Bern
- Scientific career
- Fields: Child psychiatry
- Workplaces: Bellevue Hospital, New York University, Jewish Board of Family and Children's Services

Peter Bela Neubauer (July 5, 1913 – February 15, 2008) was an Austrian-born American child psychiatrist and psychoanalyst.

== Life ==
The Neubauer family was part of a small Jewish community in Krems an der Donau, Austria, where Peter was born on July 5, 1913. He received his medical training at the University of Vienna and the University of Bern, in Switzerland, to which he escaped during the Nazi control of Austria. He completed his psychiatric training in Bern in 1941.

Neubauer died in New York City on February 15, 2008, at the age of 94.

== Career ==
Neubauer immigrated to New York in 1941, where he took a position on the staff of Bellevue Hospital.

In an early influential paper, "The One-Parent Child and His Oedipal Development" (1960), Neubauer indicated that a father's absence could jeopardize child development as seriously as maternal deprivation. He worked closely with Anna Freud at the Hampstead Clinic in London, and from the 1970s to his death, Neubauer was a co-editor of The Psychoanalytic Study of the Child, an annual publication of Yale University. He was one of the first to study the emotional impact on children witnessing violence in television and film.

=== Twin-separation research and controversy ===
Neubauer's published books include Nature's Thumbprint: The New Genetics of Personality, which includes some discussion of his controversial long-term study of adoptive Jewish twins (likely at least eleven sets) and triplets (one set) separated during infancy. Neither the children nor their adoptive parents were aware of the real reason they were all being studied or that the children had identical siblings. Some of the twins eventually learned that their separation had been deliberate as a "nature versus nurture" experiment by Neubauer. A documentary titled "Separated at Birth: Twins and Triplets Reunite After Cruel Experiment" includes interviews with some of these twins and mentions Columbia University as another sponsor of the original experiment.

These revelations led to controversy, anger, and ethical comparisons with notorious twin experiments by the same Nazi regime that Neubauer had escaped. Some of the subjects of Neubauer's twin study have sought records, apologies and compensation from the Jewish Board of Family and Children's Services, which inherited Neubauer's study records. At least three of the separated siblings apparently died by suicide. The experiment was discussed in the 2007 memoir Identical Strangers: A Memoir of Twins Separated and Reunited by Elyse Schein and Paula Bernstein, as well as the documentary films The Twinning Reaction (2017) and Three Identical Strangers (2018) and the television episode "Secret Siblings" (2018). At the conclusion of the study in 1980, Neubauer reportedly feared that public opinion would be against the study, and declined to publish it. The records of the study are sealed at the Yale University Library until October 25, 2065, although by 2018, some 10,000 pages had been released but were heavily redacted and inconclusive.

Neubauer served as Director of the Jewish Board's Child Development Center, President of the Association for Child Psychoanalysis, Clinical Professor of Psychiatry at New York University, and Secretary General of the International Association of Child Psychiatry and Allied Professions.
