= 188th Infantry Brigade (United States) =

Brigade of the United States Army, based at Fort Stewart

- 188th Infantry Brigade shoulder sleeve insignia
- Active: 24 June 1921 – 7 February 1946; 13 February 1947 – 1 May 1959; 25 October 1997 – 16 October 1999; 1 December 2006 – Present
- Country: United States of America
- Branch: Army Reserve
- Type: Infantry
- Role: Training
- Size: Brigade
- Part of: 85th Support Command
- Garrison/HQ: Fort Stewart, Georgia
- Motto: Procinctus (Ready for Battle)
- Engagements: World War II
- Decorations: Army Superior Unit Award

Commanders
- Commander: Colonel Andrew Sinden
- CSM: Command Sergeant Major Simpson A. Barber Jr.

Insignia
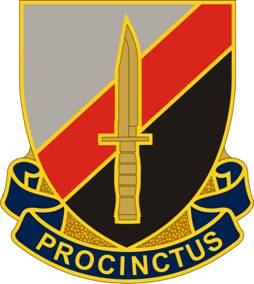
- Distinctive unit insignia

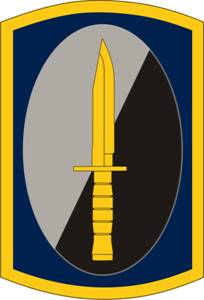
- Designated but not authorized shoulder sleeve insignia

- Insignia of the 94th Infantry Division, worn as a reconnaissance troop

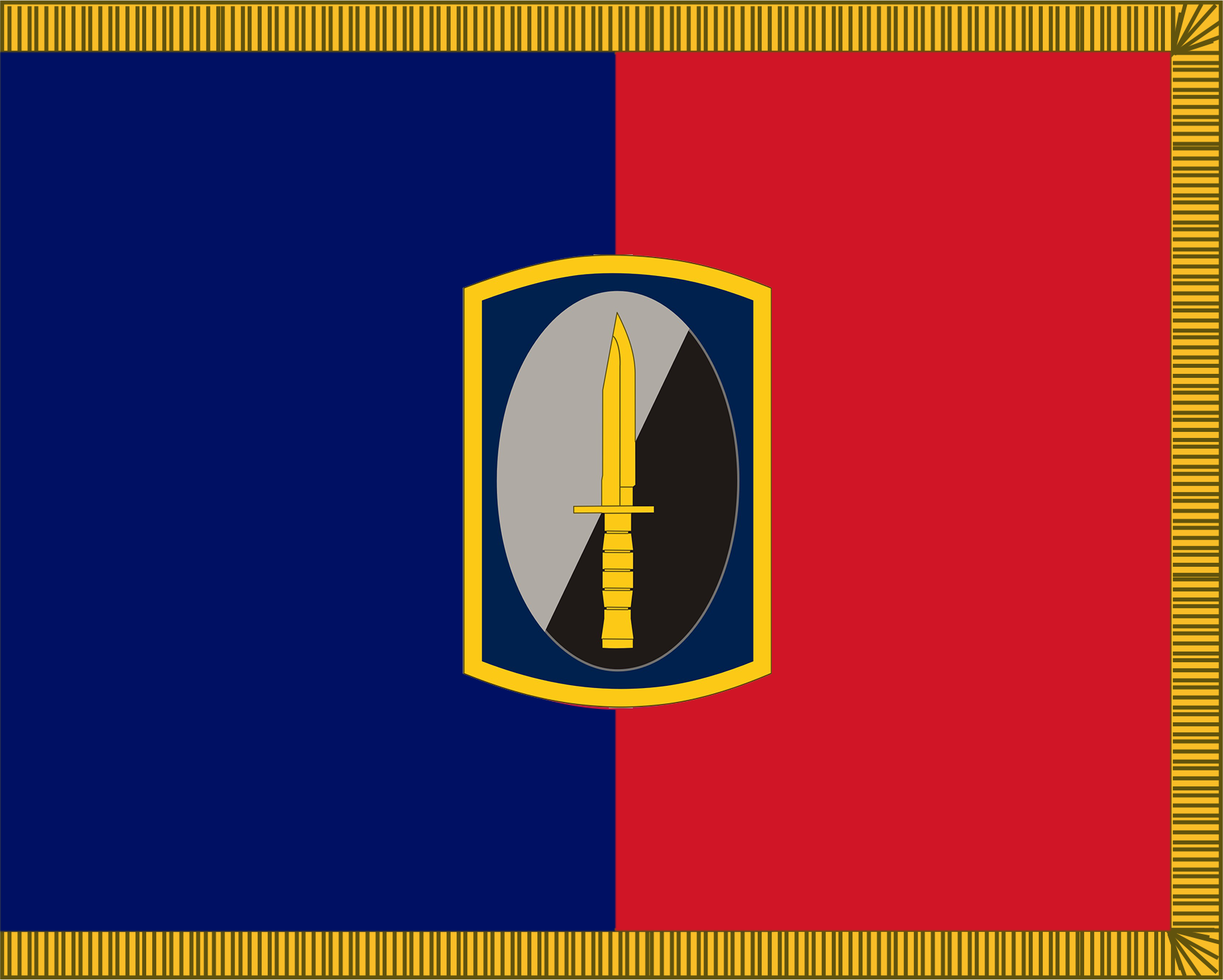
- 188th Infantry Brigade Flag

The 188th Infantry Brigade is an infantry training brigade of the United States Army based at Fort Stewart, Georgia. It is a subordinate unit of the First United States Army, Division East.

Active from 1921 to 1942 as part of the 94th Infantry Division, the brigade was transformed into a reconnaissance troop during and after World War II, supporting the 94th Division as it fought in Europe. Activated again from 1997 to 1999 and again in 2006, the unit gained responsibility for conducting training for other reserve component army units with a variety of purposes. Today, the unit is responsible for training selected United States Army Reserve and National Guard units East of the Mississippi River.

== Organization ==
The brigade is subordinate to First Army Division East of the First United States Army, one of nine training brigades spread throughout the United States.

=== 2006 Organization ===
- Headquarters and Headquarters Company, Fort Stewart, Georgia
- 1st Battalion, 306th Regiment (Infantry)
- 2nd Battalion, 306th Regiment (Field Artillery)
- 3rd Battalion, 345th Regiment (Training Support Battalion)
- 1st Battalion, 347th Regiment (Training Support Battalion)
- 2nd Battalion, 349th Regiment (Logistics Support Battalion)

=== 2026 Organization ===
The 188th Infantry Brigade is a Combined Arms Training Brigade (CATB) assigned to the 85th Support Command. Like all formations of the 85th Support Command, the brigade is not a combat formation, but instead trains Army Reserve and Army National Guard units preparing for deployment. As of January 2026, the brigade consists of a Headquarters and Headquarters Company, six active duty battalions, and five reserve battalions.

- 188th Infantry Brigade, at Fort Stewart (GA)
  - Headquarters and Headquarters Company, at Fort Stewart (GA)
  - 1st Battalion, 306th Regiment (Infantry), at Fort Stewart (GA)
  - 2nd Battalion, 306th Regiment (Field Artillery), at Fort Stewart (GA)
  - 4th Battalion, 306th Regiment (Brigade Engineer Battalion), at Fort Stewart (GA)
  - 5th Battalion, 306th Regiment (Brigade Support Battalion), at Fort Stewart (GA)
  - 2nd Battalion, 345th Regiment (Training Support), at Fort Jackson (SC)
  - 3rd Battalion, 345th Regiment (Training Support), at Fort Gillem (GA)
  - 1st Battalion, 346th Regiment (Air Defense Artillery), at Fort Stewart (GA)
  - 1st Battalion, 347th Regiment (Training Support), at Fort Gillem (GA)
  - 2nd Battalion, 347th Regiment (Training Support), at Fort Gordon (GA)
  - 2nd Battalion, 349th Regiment (Logistical Support), at Fort Stewart (GA)
  - 3rd Battalion, 395th Regiment (Armor), at Fort Stewart (GA)

The brigade's four training support battalions and logistical support battalion are Army Reserve formations.

== History ==
The 188th Infantry Brigade was first constituted on 24 June 1921 in the organized reserves at Boston, Massachusetts. It was organized with two infantry regiments, the 376th Infantry Regiment and the 419th Infantry Regiment. It was, in turn, assigned to the 94th Infantry Division. From 1921 to 1942 the division remained on the Massachusetts organized reserve rolls, though the unit did not assemble except for regular weekend training. In 1925, the brigade relocated to Worcester, Massachusetts and in 1940 it moved to Springfield, Massachusetts.

=== 94th Reconnaissance Troop ===
The 94th Infantry Division was mobilized for deployment for World War II on 15 September 1942 at Fort Custer, Michigan. During this mobilization the 188th Infantry Brigade went through a series of reorganizations. The 376th Infantry Regiment continued as part of the 94th Infantry Division and the remainder of the 188th Infantry Brigade became the 94th Reconnaissance Troop, still assigned to the 94th Infantry Division.

The 94th Infantry Division, with the troop in tow, landed on Utah Beach on 8 September 1944, 94 days after D-Day. It and moved into Brittany to assume responsibility for containing some 60,000 German troops besieged in the ports of Lorient and Saint-Nazaire. The 94th inflicted over 2,700 casualties on the German forces and took 566 prisoners before being relieved on 1 January 1945.

Moving west, the troop followed the division as it took positions in the Saar-Moselle Triangle, facing the Siegfried Switch Line on 7 January 1945, and shifted to the offensive on 14 January, seizing Tettingen and Butzdorf that day. The following day, the Nennigberg-Wies area was wrested from the German army, but heavy counterattacks followed and Butzdorf, Berg, and most of Nennig changed hands several times before being finally secured. On 20 January, an unsuccessful battalion attack against Orscholz, eastern terminus of the switch position, cost the division most of two companies. In early February, the division, with troop in tow, took the woods of Campholz and later Sinz.

On 19 February 1945, the division launched a full-scale attack, storming Munzigen Ridge, the backbone of the Saar-Moselle Triangle, and captured all of its objectives. Moving forward, the 94th Infantry Division, along with the 10th Armored Division, secured the area from Orscholz to the confluence of the Saar and Moselle Rivers by 21 February 1945. Then, launching an attack across the Saar, it established and expanded a bridgehead. By 2 March 1945, the division stretched over a 10-mile (16 km) front, from Hocker Hill on the Saar through Zerf, and Lampaden to Ollmuth. A heavy German attack near Lampaden achieved penetrations, but the line was shortly restored, and on 13 March, spearheading the XX Corps, the 94th broke out of the bridgehead and drove to the Rhine River, reaching it on 21 March. Ludwigshafen was taken on 24 March, with assistance from elements the 12th Armored Division.

The 94th Infantry Division then moved by railroad and motor to the vicinity of Krefeld, Germany, assuming responsibility for containing the west side of the Ruhr pocket from positions along the Rhine on 3 April. With the reduction of the pocket in mid-April, the 94th Infantry Division was assigned military government duties, first in the Krefeld and later in the Düsseldorf areas. Soldiers of the troop participated in this assignment.

The 94th Infantry Division participated in four World War II campaigns on mainland Europe. The 94th Reconnaissance Troop supported the division throughout its push through Europe. Upon the end of fighting in Europe, the 94th Infantry Division began conducting occupation duty in Europe until it returned to the US at the end of 1945. The Troop was demobilized at Camp Kilmer, New Jersey and deactivated on 7 February 1946.

The troop was reactivated on 13 February 1947 in Boston, Massachusetts. However, the troop did not see any significant actions during its post war years, still a part of the 94th Infantry Division, which itself was never called on for service. The troop was moved to Cohasset, Massachusetts in 1953, remaining there for another six years as an inactive reserve unit until 1959, when it was again disbanded and inactivated.

=== Training brigade ===
On 24 October 1997, the 188th Infantry Brigade was reactivated again in the Active duty force at Fort Stewart, Georgia. It was a reflagging of the 4th Brigade, 87th Division. The brigade was reactivated to provide training support to Reserve Component units in the region.

As of 1998 there were 248 soldiers assigned to the Brigade in five training support battalions and the Brigade Headquarters. At that time, the 188th Infantry Brigade supported the training of over 5,000 National Guard and Reserve Component soldiers in infantry, armor, cavalry, aviation, artillery, communications, medical, maintenance, and supply units.

The Brigade was composed entirely of active duty senior noncommissioned officers and officers who conducted training assistance and valuations for a variety of combat arms, combat support and combat service support units. A new building was constructed on Fort Stewart, Georgia for the Brigade and was occupied in August 1997. The First United States Army, the Brigade's higher headquarters, also purchased new furniture and computers for the Brigade's use. In 1999, the brigade was again reflagged as the 4th Brigade, 87th Division.

=== Present day ===
The brigade was reactivated on 1 October 2006 as part of another consolidation of US Army training commands, again at Fort Stewart. The division fell under the command of Division East of the First United States Army. During the consolidation, the brigade was given a larger area of responsibility, supporting the training of over 18,000 National Guard and Reserve Component soldiers in infantry, armor, cavalry, aviation, artillery, communications, medical, maintenance, and supply units both at and around the Fort Stewart area. The brigade grew to over 600 soldiers assigned to 6 training support battalions and the Headquarters.

On 15 January 2008, the brigade received a shoulder sleeve insignia and distinctive unit insignia. Both of these allude to the brigade's service to the 94th Infantry Division both during peacetime and as the 94th Reconnaissance Troop during and after World War II.

== Honors ==
=== Decorations ===
Ribbon	Award	Year	Orders
	Army Superior Unit Award	2008-2011	Permanent Orders 332-07 announcing award of the Army Superior Unit award

=== Campaign streamers ===
Conflict	Streamer	Year(s)
World War II	Northern France	1944
World War II	Rhineland	1944–1945
World War II	Ardennes-Alsace	1944–1945
World War II	Central Europe	1945

== Sources ==
- McGrath, John J. (2004). The Brigade: A History: Its Organization and Employment in the US Army. Combat Studies Institute Press. ISBN 978-1-4404-4915-4.
- Army Almanac: A Book of Facts Concerning the Army of the United States. United States Government Printing Office. 1959. ASIN B0006D8NKK.
