= Identical Strangers =

2007 memoir by reunited identical twins

Identical Strangers: A Memoir of Twins Separated and Reunited
- Author: Elyse Schein, Paula Bernstein
- Genre: Memoir
- Publisher: Random House
- Publication date: 2007

Identical Strangers: A Memoir of Twins Separated and Reunited is a 2007 memoir written by identical twins Elyse Schein and Paula Bernstein and published by Random House. The authors, born in New York City in 1968 to Leda Witt, daughter of Nathan Witt, were separated as infants, in part, to participate in a "nature versus nurture" twin study. They were adopted by separate families in the New York area who were unaware that each girl had a twin sister. Soon after the twins reunited for the first time in 2004 at the age of 35, they began writing the book. Of the 13 or more children involved in the study, three sets of twins and one set of triplets have discovered one another. One or two sets of twins may still not know they have an identical twin.

When the twins compared notes, they discovered that they both studied film, battled depression, and shared mannerisms like "air-typing." They both saved Alice in Wonderland dolls in their original packaging.

== Twins study ==
Viola Bernard, a prominent New York City psychiatrist, had persuaded Louise Wise Services, an adoption agency, to send twins to different homes without telling the adoptive parents that they were adopting a child who had a twin. Then, researchers sponsored by the Jewish Board of Family and Children's Services secretly compared their progress. Bernard believed that identical twins would better forge individual identities if separated. By the time the twins started to investigate their adoptions, Bernard had already died, but the twins were able to meet with New York University psychiatrist Peter Neubauer who had studied them.

The twins study they were involved with was never completed. The practice of separating twins at birth ended in the state of New York in 1980, shortly after Neubauer's study ceased. Neubauer reportedly had Yale University lock away and seal the study records until 2065. He realized that public opinion would be so against the research that he decided not to publish it. As of 2007, the sisters and other twins had not persuaded Yale or the Jewish Board to release the records. By 2018, some 10,000 pages had been released but were heavily redacted and inconclusive.

The Neubauer study differed from most twins studies in that it followed the twins from infancy. However, the debate about whether nature or nurture has a greater impact on human development continues. The documentary Three Identical Strangers, which told the story of three male triplets who were also part of the study and found one another at age 19, noted that although much was made of superficial similarities among the three, their personalities were significantly different because they were raised by parents with profoundly different personalities and child-rearing practices. In addition, no one can accurately assess to what degree each infant in the study was shaped by the trauma of separation after several months together as infants. Some researchers believe that children's differences are forged less by their families than by genetics and chance. Contrasting neuroscience research of the last three or four decades supports the claim that minds are formed through relationships, especially in the first 1000 days of a child's life.

In an interview with NPR, Bernstein said that twins force us to question "what it is that makes us who we are." Meeting her twin made it clear to her that genetics play a huge role in shaping our identity - probably more than 50 percent.

== Documentary films ==
Two documentaries about this study have been released, The Twinning Reaction (2017) and Three Identical Strangers (2018), along with "Secret Siblings", a 2018 episode of the news magazine show 20/20.

== See also ==
- The Parent Trap
