= Barbara Ochs Adler =

American civic leader and philanthropist

Barbara Ochs Adler (1903 – 1971) was an American civic leader and philanthropist.

== Personal life ==
Barbara Stettheimer was born on January 14, 1903, in San Francisco, California. She was the daughter of Walter Stettheimer, a prominent businessman. She studied theater at Stanford University. Barbara Stettheimer married Julius Ochs Adler on August 27, 1922, six months before graduating. At the time of their marriage, he was vice president and treasurer of The New York Times Company, as well as a major in the United States Army Reserve. They had three children, Julius Ochs, Jr., Barbara Squier, and Nancy Jean. Barbara Ochs Adler died on June 3, 1971, in New York City after suffering a cerebral hemorrhage.

== Philanthropic and civic activity ==
Barbara Ochs Adler relocated to New York City following her marriage, where she became actively involved in a variety of Jewish and non-Jewish causes. She was a member of the executive committee of the Jewish Board of Guardians; she represented the agency on the board of trustees of the Federation of Jewish Philanthropies of New York. She and her husband were also members of Temple Emanu-El in New York.

During World War II, Adler served as chair of the New York City Defense Recreation Committee, which provided free entertainment for servicemen passing through New York City.

She was also particularly interested in criminology, serving as vice president of the Correctional Association of New York, board member of the National Probation and Parole Association, and worked with the Magistrates' Court Social Services Bureau. New York governor Herbert H. Lehman appointed her to the board of visitors of Westfield State Farms, a reformatory for girls in Bedford Hills, New York, in 1935; she was elected presented of the facility in 1941.
