= Hebrew Emigrant Aid Society =

Late 19th-century American charitable organization

- Abbreviation: HEAS
- Successor: United Hebrew Charities
- Formation: November 27, 1881; 144 years ago
- Dissolved: 1884; 142 years ago
- Type: Non-profit
- Headquarters: New York City, United States

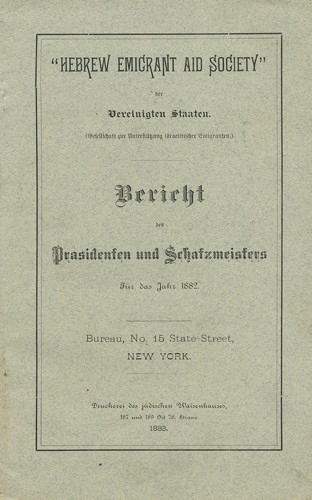
Cover of Hebrew Emigrant Aid Society annual report for 1882.

The Hebrew Emigrant Aid Society (HEAS) was a late 19th-century American charitable organization. It is distinct from the later Hebrew Immigrant Aid Society, but was involved in some of the same areas of charitable work.

== History ==
HEAS was founded in New York City on November 27, 1881, and operated until 1884. Its work was then taken over by United Hebrew Charities. The organization ran shelters for recent Jewish immigrants at Castle Garden, New York's immigration center at the Battery prior to the 1892 opening of the facility at Ellis Island; Wards Island near the meeting point of Manhattan, The Bronx and Queens; and Greenpoint in Brooklyn. The organization favored limits on immigration.

Founded by German Jewish Americans, HEAS has been widely criticized for its high-handedness toward the Eastern European Jewish immigrants arriving in this period. For example, Richard F. Shepard and Vicki Gold Levi, writing in 2000, called the organization, "Probably the least admirable of the multitude of charities established by uptown German Jews for their immigrant brethren...," operating "imperiously" and never consulting with the recent immigrants it was ostensibly intended to help.

Among HEAS's most famous volunteers was poet Emma Lazarus, best known for her 1883 sonnet "The New Colossus", now inscribed on the pedestal of the Statue of Liberty Lazarus volunteered in the HEAS employment bureau; she eventually became a strong critic of the organization. Lazarus wrote of HEAS's Schiff Shelter on Wards Island, "Not a drop of running water is to be found in the dormitories or refectories, or in any of the other buildings, except the kitchen. In all weathers, those who wish to wash their hands or to fetch or to fetch a cup of water, have to walk over several hundred feet of irregular, dirty ground, strewn with rubble and refuse, and filled, after a rainfall, with stagnant pools of muddy water in which throngs of idle children are allowed to dabble at will... Not a single practical step has been taken to provide tuition..."
