= 77th Sustainment Brigade =

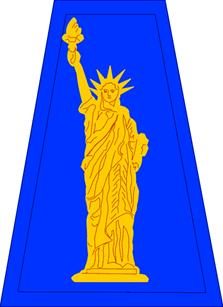
- 77th Sustainment Brigade shoulder sleeve insignia
- Active: 5 August 1917–9 May 1919 (National Army); 24 June 1921–15 March 1946 (Organized Reserve); 1 May 1959–30 December 1965 (Army Reserve); 22 April 1968–16 July 2003 (77th RSC); 16 July 2003–18 September 2008 (77th RRC); 18 September 2008–present (77th Sust. Bge.)
- Country: United States
- Branch: United States Army Reserve
- Type: Sustainment
- Size: Brigade
- Part of: 316th Expeditionary Sustainment Command
- Garrison/HQ: Joint Base McGuire-Dix-Lakehurst
- Nickname: "Statue of Liberty" (special designation)
- Engagements: World War I; Oise-Aisne; Meuse-Argonne; Champagne 1918; Lorraine 1918; World War II; Pacific War; Western Pacific; Ryukyus; Operation Iraqi Freedom

Commanders
- Current commander: Colonel Benjamin N. Owen
- Notable commanders: J. Franklin Bell; George B. Duncan; Robert Alexander; Robert L. Eichelberger; Roscoe B. Woodruff; Andrew D. Bruce; Julius Ochs Adler

Insignia
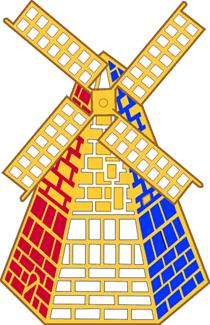
- 77th Sustainment Brigade DUI

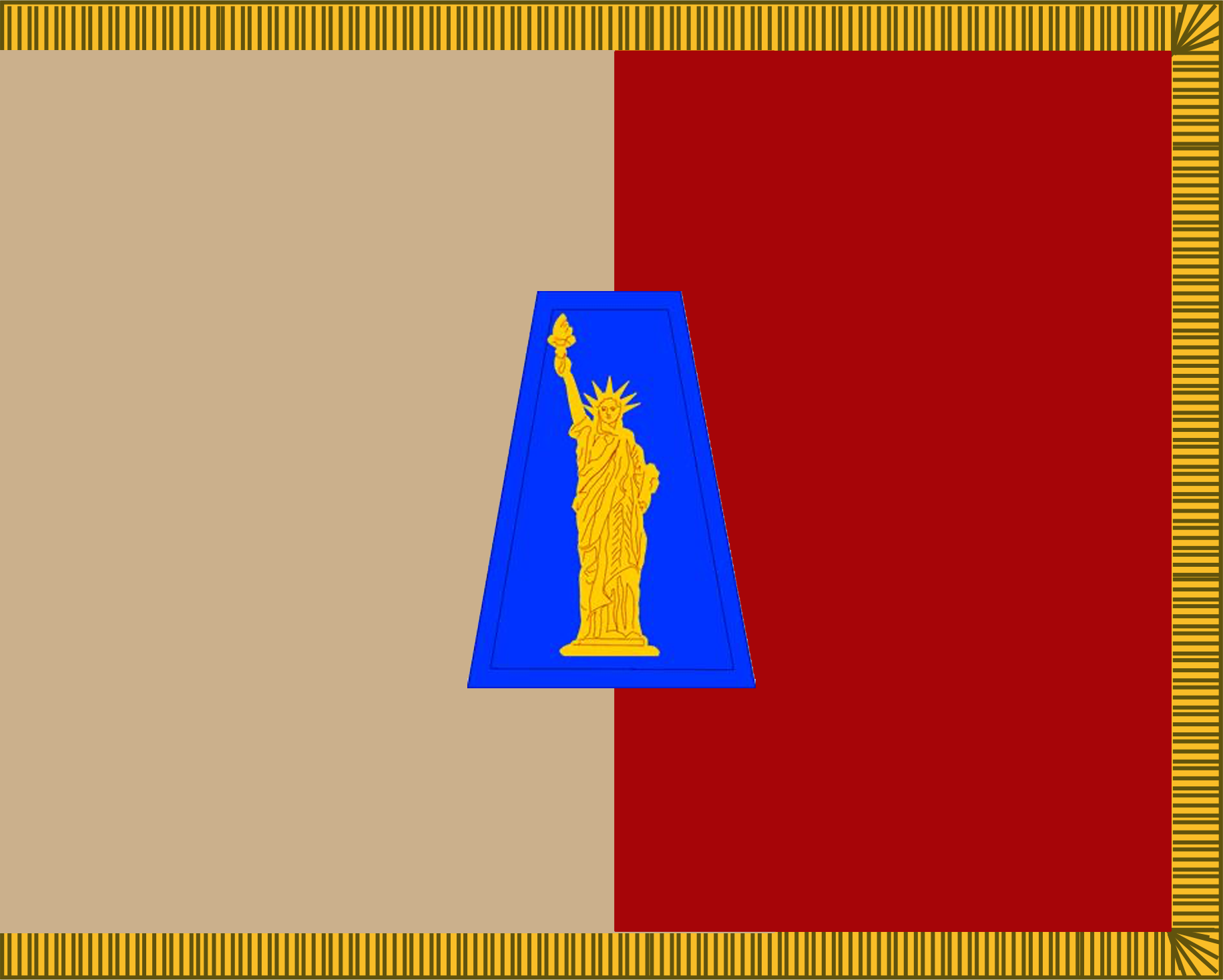
- 77th Sustainment Brigade Flag

The 77th Sustainment Brigade is a unit of the United States Army that inherited the lineage of the 77th Infantry Division ("Statue of Liberty"), which served in World War I and World War II. Its headquarters has been at Fort Dix, New Jersey, since its predecessor command, the 77th Regional Readiness Command, was disestablished in 2008 from Fort Totten in Bayside, Queens, New York. Soldiers from the 77th have served in most major conflicts and contingency operations involving the US since World War II.

The division is nicknamed the "Statue of Liberty Division"; the shoulder patch bears the Statue of Liberty in gold on a blue isosceles-trapezoid shape. U.S. Marines on Guam nicknamed them the "77th Marine Division".

The Clearview Expressway in Queens, New York, is named the "U.S. Army 77th Infantry Division Expressway", honoring the division and its successor commands.

== History ==
=== World War I ===
On 5 August 1917, the War Department constituted the 77th Division, which was to be composed of draftees from New York City and the adjoining counties. The division was organized at Camp Upton in Yaphank, New York, in the central part of Suffolk County, Long Island; the camp is now Brookhaven National Laboratory. On 13 August, the formation of the division headquarters was directed, and on 16 August, Major General J. Franklin Bell assumed command. During the last week of August, organization of the division began around a cadre of officers and men from the Regular Army, Officers Reserve Corps, and National Army officer graduates of the First Officers Training Camp at Plattsburg, New York. On 18 September, the initial draft of 2,000 Selective Service men arrived at Camp Upton, and from 19-24 September, an additional 19,000 arrived. In September, systematic training began. On 31 October, the division numbered about 23,000 men, but during November, many transfers, in spite of a fresh draft of 750 men, reduced the division to less than 18,000. From 5-10 December, the last drafts of 1917 furnished Camp Upton with 8,500 men, and by 31 December, the strength of the 77th Division again reached 23,000. During the winter, fresh drafts were received from Camp Devens, Massachusetts, and other camps, but 4,500 men were transferred from the division during January and February. In March, new arrivals completed the division.

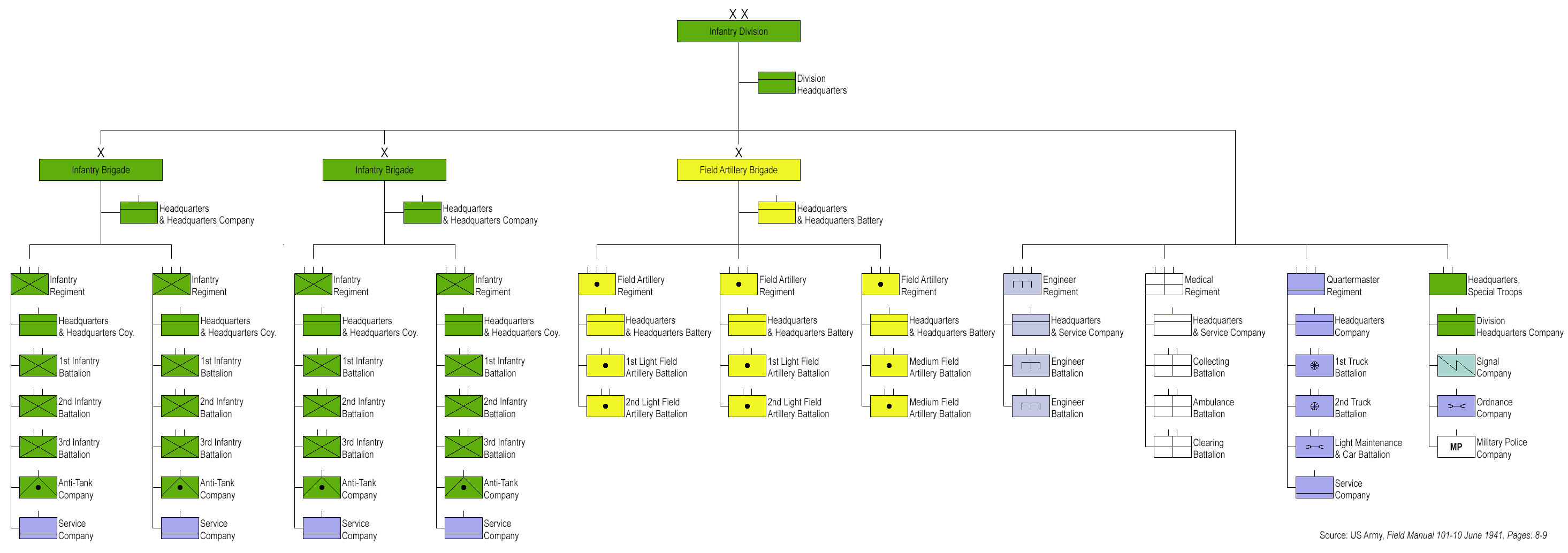
Square Division example: 1940 US Infantry Division. On the far left can be seen two brigades of two regiments each.

The 77th was the first American division composed of draftees to arrive in France in World War I, landing in April 1918; overall, it was the seventh of 42 divisions to reach the Western Front. The division fought in the Battle of Château-Thierry on 18 July 1918 and later in the Meuse–Argonne offensive, the largest battle in the history of the United States Army, from late September until the Armistice with Germany on November 11, 1918. During its service in France, the 77th Division sustained 10,194 casualties: of these 1,486 men were killed and another 8,708 were wounded.

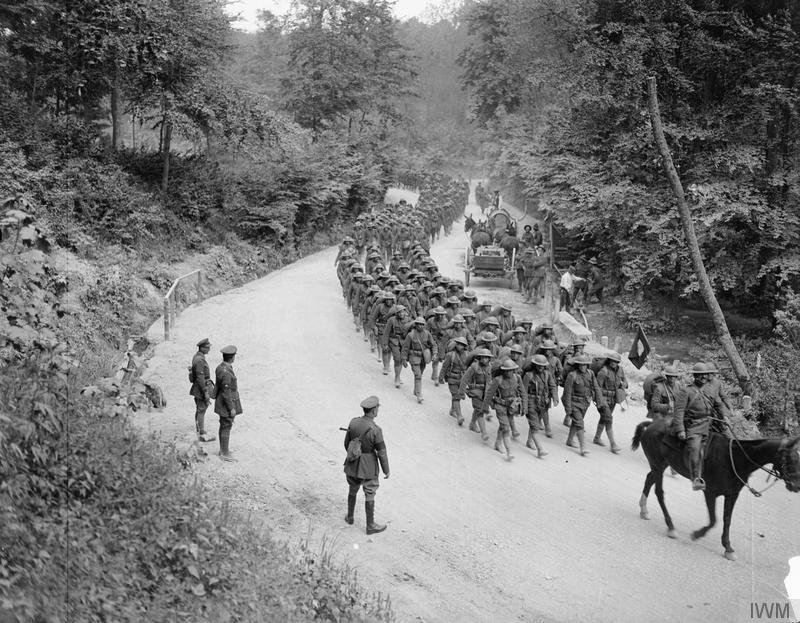
Men of the 307th Infantry Regiment (attached to the British 42nd Division for instruction), headed by a British regimental band, marching past Major-General Arthur Solly-Flood (42nd Division) on a road near Famechon, France, 7 June 1918.

The division, after serving on occupation duties for the next few months, returned to the United States in April 1919 and was demobilized at Camp Upton later that month.

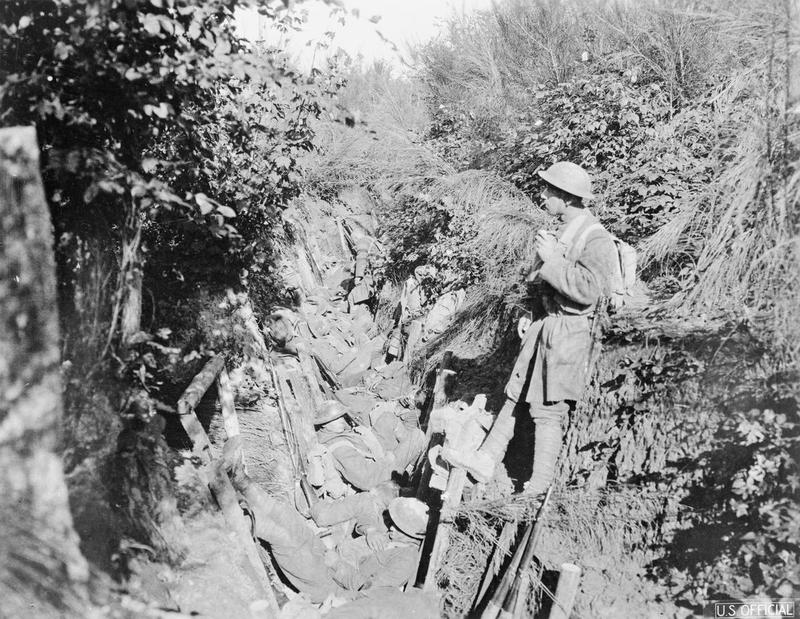
Men of Company I, 308th Infantry, resting after capturing German second line trenches 1½ miles north of Le Four de Paris; Lieutenant Stewart in charge: Foret d'Argonne (Forest of Argonne), September 1918.

The 153rd Infantry Brigade consisted of the 305th Infantry Regiment, 306th Infantry Regiment, and 305th Machine Gun Battalion. The brigade was initially commanded by Brigadier General Edmund Wittenmyer.

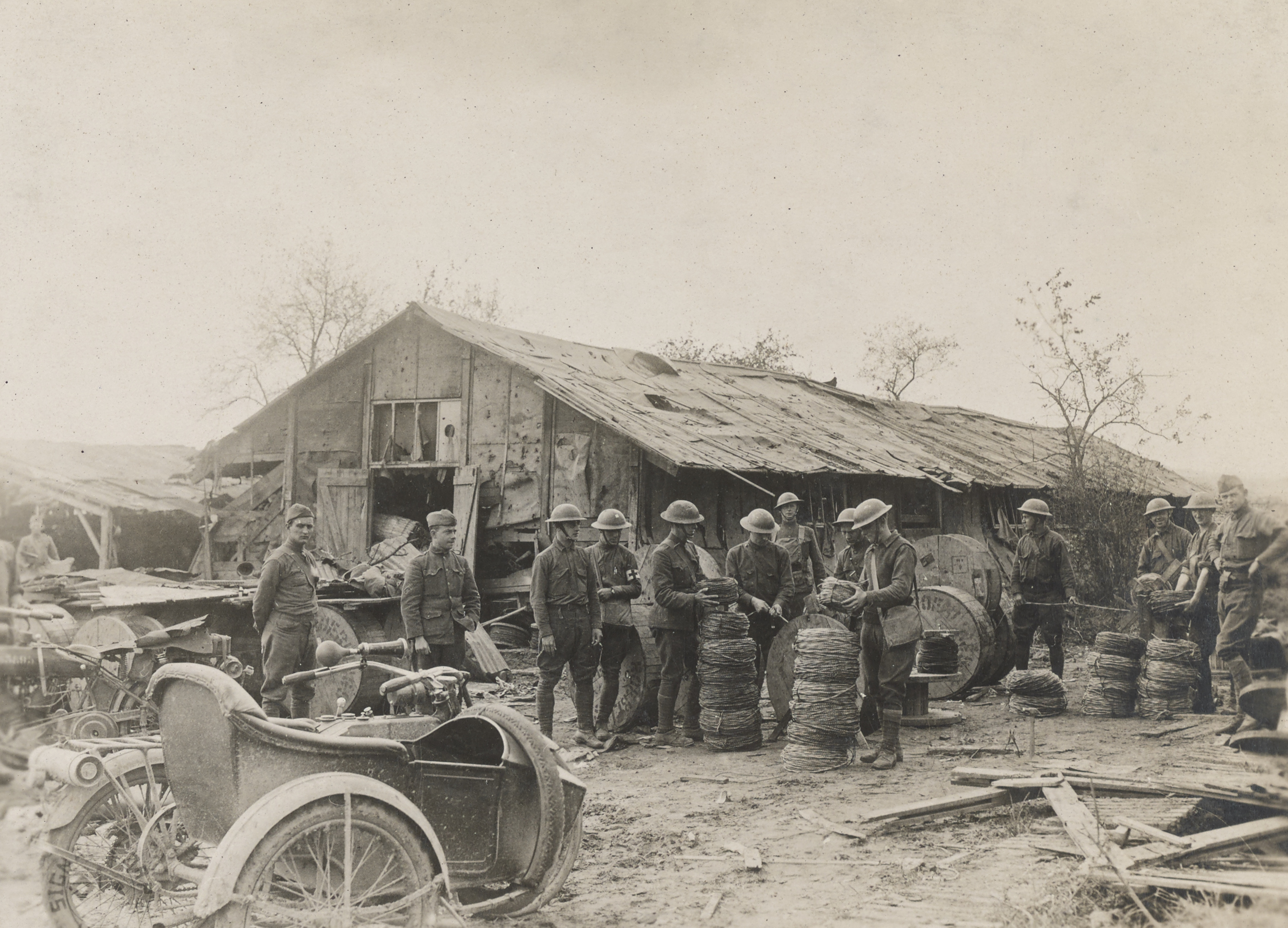
Doughboys of the 302nd Field Signal Battalion, 77th Division, unrolling and rewinding telephone wire into smaller rolls for convenience in field work, near Vesle, France, September 6, 1918.

The 154th Infantry Brigade was composed of the 307th and 308th Infantry Regiments and the 306th Machine Gun Battalion. The brigade's inaugural commander was Brigadier General Evan M. Johnson.

While the division had been recruited as a National Army unit from the New York City area, attrition and replacements had complicated the complexion of the unit. For example, the 40th Division had been converted into a "depot division" in August 1918 to equip, train, and forward replacements to other units, and in the process, Company L of the 160th Infantry, part of the California National Guard, had supplied many of its original men to Company K of the 307th Infantry as replacements.

The "Lost Battalion" of World War I fame was composed of six companies of the 308th Infantry Regiment and one from the 307th Infantry Regiment.

- 77th Division Commanders:
  - Maj. Gen. J. Franklin Bell (18 August 1917)
  - Brig. Gen. Evan M. Johnson (4 December 1917)
  - Maj. Gen. G. B. Duncan (8 May 1918)
  - Brig. Gen. Evan M. Johnson (20 July 1918)
  - Brig. Gen. Evan M. Johnson (19 August 1918)
  - Maj. Gen. Robert Alexander (27 August 1918)

==== Order of battle ====
- Headquarters, 77th Division
- 153rd Infantry Brigade
  - 305th Infantry Regiment
  - 306th Infantry Regiment
  - 305th Machine Gun Battalion
- 154th Infantry Brigade
  - 307th Infantry Regiment
  - 308th Infantry Regiment
  - 306th Machine Gun Battalion
- 152nd Field Artillery Brigade
  - 304th Field Artillery Regiment (75 mm)
  - 305th Field Artillery Regiment (75 mm)
  - 306th Field Artillery Regiment (155 mm)
  - 302nd Trench Mortar Battery
- 304th Machine Gun Battalion
- 302nd Engineer Regiment
- 302nd Field Signal Battalion
- Headquarters Troop, 77th Division
- 302nd Train Headquarters and Military Police
  - 302nd Ammunition Train
  - 302nd Supply Train
  - 302nd Engineer Train
  - 302nd Sanitary Train
    - 305th, 306th, 307th, and 308th Ambulance Companies and Field Hospitals

=== Interwar period ===
The 77th Division was reconstituted in the Organized Reserve on 24 June 1921, allotted to the Second Corps Area, and assigned to the XII Corps. The division was further allotted to the southeastern portion of the state of New York, primarily the metropolitan area of New York City and Long Island, as its home area. The division headquarters was organized on 1 July 1921 at the Army Building, 39 Whitehall Street in Manhattan, relocated in 1933 to the Federal Office Building at 641 Washington Street, and remained there until activated for World War II. The initial formation of the division began with a rush, and by July 1923, the “Statue of Liberty” Division was up to full strength in its complement of officers as required by its peacetime tables of organization and was the first Reserve division to do so. Many of its officers were Great War veterans of the division, and so there was a direct tie to the World War I organization, which established an esprit de corps equaled by few other Organized Reserve divisions during the period between the world wars. Lieutenant Colonel Charles W. Whittlesey, the commander of the famous “Lost Battalion” during World War I, was instrumental in the initial recruiting efforts to get the division up to strength in the early 1920s. The division established a clubhouse at 27 West 25th Street in Manhattan which added to the camaraderie. Over a number of years, most units of the division had bronze plaques cast and inscribed with the names of their war dead mounted in the sitting areas of the club. Some 300 officers and men of the division participated annually in the Army Day parade and over 550 participated in the homecoming parade for Charles Lindbergh on 13 June 1927. All of these served to increase the esprit and camaraderie of the Statue of Liberty Division.

The designated mobilization and training station for the division was Camp Dix, New Jersey, the location where much of the 77th’s training activities occurred in the interwar years. The division headquarters generally conducted summer training at Camp Dix, and in 1934 and 1937, conducted major division-level command post exercises (CPXs) there. On a number of occasions, the division headquarters also participated in Second Corps Area or First Army CPXs in conjunction with other Regular Army, National Guard, and Organized Reserve units. These training events gave division staff officers opportunities to practice the roles they would be expected to perform in the event the division was mobilized. The 77th Division headquarters occasionally trained with the staffs of the 1st Division or its subordinate 1st Infantry Brigade at Camp Dix, or sometimes at Fort Slocum, New York. For 1 year, in 1926, the officers of the division headquarters trained with the staff of the New York National Guard's 27th Division at Camp Smith, near Peekskill, New York. In 1923, the division officers, with assistance from Colonel Peter E. Traub, the division chief of staff, established Camp Blauvelt near Nyack, New York, for the purposes of providing a small training area for the division. Camp Blauvelt was frequently used for unpaid weekend or two-week inactive duty “contact camps” by subordinate units for their officers, and occasionally by the division staff for mini-CPXs. The subordinate infantry regiments of the division generally held their summer training primarily with the units of the 1st Infantry Brigade at Camp Dix, but other units, such as the special troops, artillery, engineers, aviation, medical, and quartermaster, trained at various posts in the Second and Third Corps Areas usually with other units of the 1st Division. For example, the division’s artillery trained with the 7th Field Artillery at Pine Camp, New York; the 302nd Engineer Regiment usually trained with the 1st Engineer Regiment at Fort DuPont, Delaware; the 302nd Medical Regiment trained with the 1st Medical Regiment at Carlisle Barracks, Pennsylvania; and the 302nd Observation Squadron trained with the 5th Observation Squadron at Mitchel Field, New York. In addition to the unit training camps, the infantry regiments of the division rotated responsibility to conduct the infantry Citizens Military Training Camps (CMTC) held at Camp Dix and Plattsburg Barracks each year. The field artillery regiments conducted field artillery CMTC training at Madison Barracks, New York.

Although corps area commanders were nominally in command of the three Organized Reserve divisions in their corps area, with division chiefs of staff handling day-to-day operations, corps area commanders sometimes designated junior Regular Army or Reserve general officers in their corps areas to serve as Organized Reserve division commanders in addition to their other duties. As of 1937, the 77th Division was commanded by Brigadier General Perry L. Miles, who was concurrently the commander of the 1st Division's 2nd Infantry Brigade. Unlike the Regular and Guard units in the Second Corps Area, the 77th Division did not participate in the Second Corps Area maneuvers and the First Army maneuvers of 1935, 1939, and 1940 as an organized unit due to lack of enlisted personnel and equipment. Instead, the officers and a number of the enlisted reservists were assigned to Regular and Guard units to fill vacant slots and bring the units up to war strength for the exercises. Additionally, some were assigned duties as umpires or as support personnel. Due to the mobilization of many Organized Reserve officers beginning in 1939 for assignment to other units, all officers less those in the infantry and field artillery were relieved from their divisional assignments in July 1941 and assigned to branch pools instead.

Division organization in 1939:

- Headquarters (Manhattan, NY)
- Headquarters, Special Troops (Manhattan, NY)
  - Headquarters Company (Manhattan, NY)
  - 77th Military Police Company (Manhattan, NY)
  - 77th Signal Company (Manhattan, NY)
  - 302nd Ordnance Company (Medium) (Manhattan, NY)
  - 77th Tank Company (Light) (Manhattan, NY)
- 153rd Infantry Brigade (Manhattan, NY)
  - 305th Infantry Regiment (Brooklyn, NY)
  - 306th Infantry Regiment (Flushing, NY)
- 154th Infantry Brigade (Manhattan, NY)
  - 307th Infantry Regiment (Manhattan, NY)
  - 308th Infantry Regiment (Bronx, NY)
- 152nd Field Artillery Brigade (Manhattan, NY)
  - 304th Field Artillery Regiment (75 mm) (Brooklyn, NY)
  - 305th Field Artillery Regiment (75 mm) (Manhattan, NY)
  - 306th Field Artillery Regiment (155 mm) (Bronx, NY)
  - 302nd Ammunition Train (Manhattan, NY)
- 302nd Engineer Regiment (Manhattan, NY)
- 302nd Medical Regiment (Manhattan, NY)
- 402nd Quartermaster Regiment (Brooklyn, NY)

=== World War II ===
- Ordered into active military service: 25 March 1942, Fort Jackson, South Carolina
- Trained at Camp Hyder, California in 1943
- Overseas: 24 March 1944
- Campaigns: Western Pacific, Leyte, Ryukyus
- Days of Combat: 200
- Distinguished Unit Citations: 16
- Awards: Medal of Honor: 6; Distinguished Service Cross: 19; Distinguished Service Medal: 2; Silver Star: 335; Legion of Merit: 22; Soldier's Medal: 25; Bronze Star: 4,433; Air Medal: 4
- Commanders:
  - Maj. Gen. Robert L. Eichelberger (March–June 1942)
  - Maj. Gen. Roscoe B. Woodruff (June 1942 – May 1943)
  - Maj. Gen. Andrew D. Bruce (May 1943 – 27 February 1946)
- Chaplain: Fray Angélico Chávez
- Inactivated: 15 March 1946 in Japan

==== Mobilization ====
Before Organized Reserve infantry divisions were ordered into active military service, they were reorganized on paper as "triangular" divisions under the 1940 tables of organization. The headquarters companies of the two infantry brigades were consolidated into the division's cavalry reconnaissance troop, and one infantry regiment was removed by inactivation. The field artillery brigade headquarters and headquarters battery became the headquarters and headquarters battery of the division artillery. Its three field artillery regiments were reorganized into four battalions; one battalion was taken from each of the two 75 mm gun regiments to form two 105 mm howitzer battalions, the brigade's ammunition train was reorganized as the third 105 mm howitzer battalion, and the 155 mm howitzer battalion was formed from the 155 mm howitzer regiment. The engineer, medical, and quartermaster regiments were reorganized into battalions. In 1942, divisional quartermaster battalions were split into ordnance light maintenance companies and quartermaster companies, and the division's headquarters and military police company, which had previously been a combined unit, was split.

The 77th Infantry Division was ordered into active military service on 25 March 1942 around a cadre of officers and men mostly drawn from the 8th and 30th Infantry Divisions. The initial enlisted fillers came from the First, Second, and Third Corps Areas (the Northeastern United States), sent from Fort Devens, Fort Dix, Camp Upton, Fort Niagara, New York, and Fort George G. Meade, Maryland. After basic and advanced training, the division participated in the Third Army Louisiana No. 1 Maneuvers from 1 February to 28 March 1943

==== Division organization ====
The division consisted of the following units:

77th Infantry Division organization (click to enlarge)

- 77th Infantry Division
  - 77th Infantry Division Headquarters
  - 77th Cavalry Reconnaissance Troop (Mechanized) (M3 scout cars and then M8 Greyhound armored cars)
  - 305th Infantry Regiment
    - Headquarters and Headquarters Company
    - 3× Infantry battalions
      - each battalion consists of: 1× Headquarters and Headquarters Company, 3× Rifle companies, 1× Heavy Weapons Company
    - Cannon Company (T12 Gun Motor Carriages and T19 Howitzer Motor Carriages, later replaced by either M3 105mm towed howitzers or M7 Priest self propelled howitzers)
    - Anti-Tank Company (M3 37mm anti-tank guns, which were replaced by 1944 with M1 57mm anti-tank guns)
    - Service Company
  - 306th Infantry Regiment
    - same organization as 305th Infantry Regiment
  - 307th Infantry Regiment
    - same organization as 305th Infantry Regiment
  - 77th Infantry Division Artillery
    - Headquarters and Headquarters Battery
    - 304th Field Artillery Battalion
      - Headquarters and Headquarters Battery
      - 3× Batteries (M2 105mm towed howitzers)
      - Service Battery
    - 305th Field Artillery Battalion
      - same organization as 304th Field Artillery Battalion
    - 306th Field Artillery Battalion
      - Headquarters and Headquarters Battery
      - 3× Batteries (M1 155mm towed howitzers)
      - Service Battery
    - 902nd Field Artillery Battalion
      - same organization as 304th Field Artillery Battalion
  - Headquarters Special Troops
    - Headquarters Company, 77th Infantry Division
    - 77th Signal Company
    - 77th Quartermaster Company
    - 777th Ordnance Light Maintenance Company
    - Military Police Platoon
    - 77th Infantry Division Band (attached)
  - 302nd Engineer Combat Battalion
    - Headquarters and Headquarters and Service Company
    - 3× Engineer combat companies
  - 302nd Medical Battalion
    - Headquarters and Headquarters Detachment
    - 3× Collecting companies
    - Clearing Company

==== Combat chronicle ====
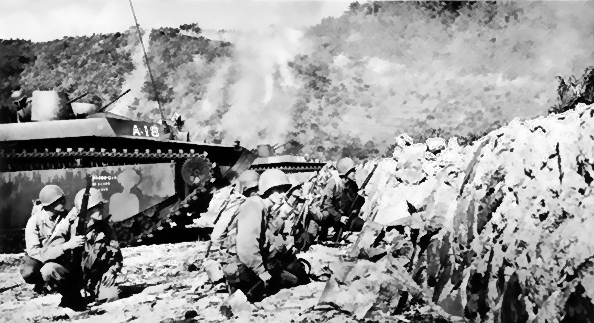
1st Battalion Landing Team, 306th Infantry, in the Kerama Islands on 27 March 1945

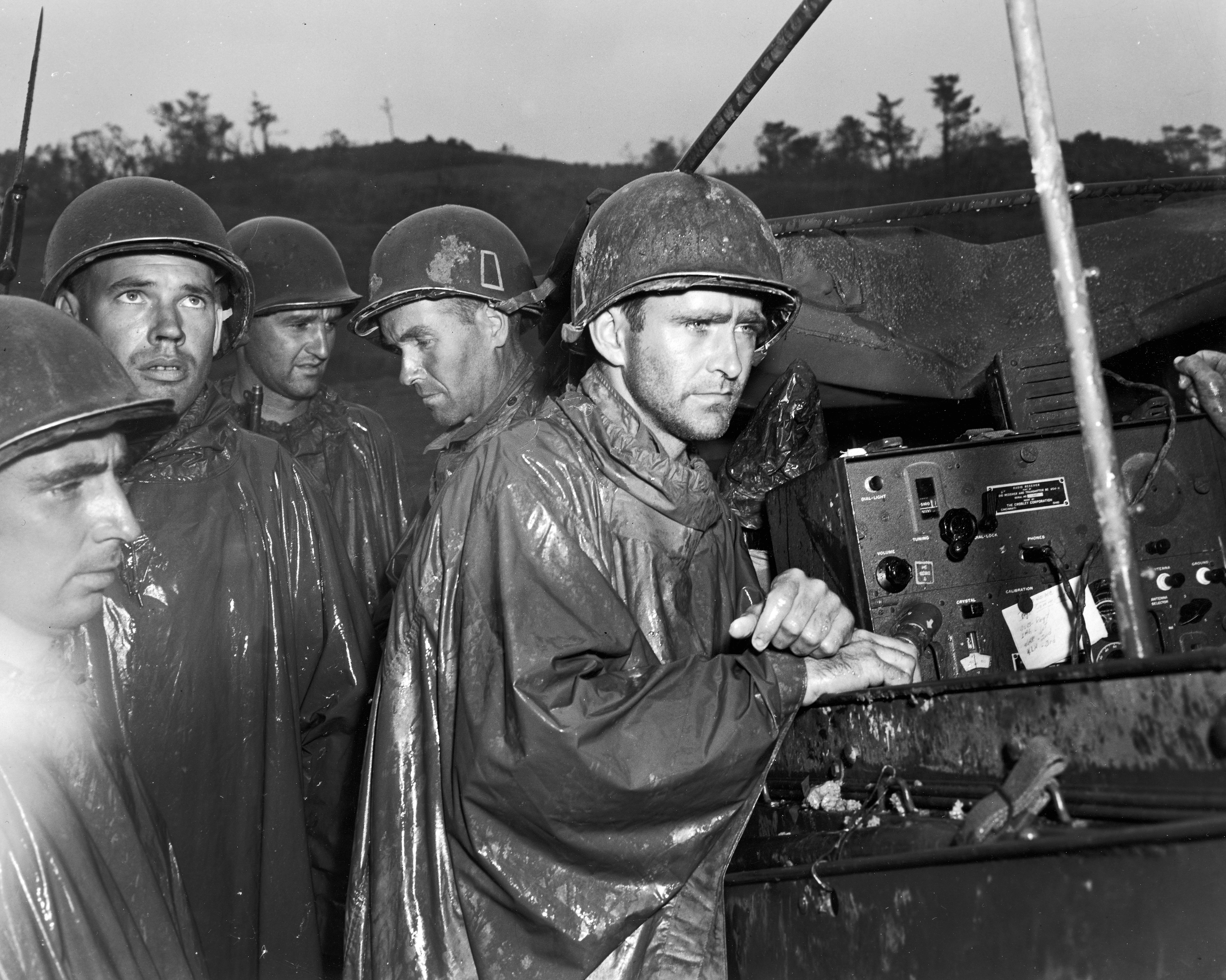
Men of the 77th Infantry division listen to radio reports of Germany's surrender on 8 May 1945.

The 77th Infantry Division moved to Hawaii, 31 March 1944, and continued training in amphibious landings and jungle warfare. Elements began to leave Hawaii, 1 July 1944, for the amphibious assault on Guam. Attached to III Amphibious Force, the 77th made an assault landing on Guam, 21 July 1944. After taking over defense of the beachhead, the division drove north to seize Mount Tenjo and effected junction with the 3rd Marine Division, linking the northern and southern bridgeheads, 23–29 July. It continued to drive north, and dislodged the enemy from positions at Barrigada town and mountain, 4 August, resistance ending on 8 August. With Guam recaptured, the 77th sailed for New Caledonia, but plans were changed en route and it was directed to proceed to Leyte. The division landed on the east coast of Leyte, 23 November 1944, and was attached to XXIV Corps, Sixth Army. After a short period of training and combat patrolling in the corps' rear, 23 November – 6 December, it landed at Ipil and fought up the east coast of Ormoc Bay to seize Ormoc on 10 December. Attacking north, astride Highway No. 2, the division secured Valencia and the Libungao-Palompon road junction. Mopping up operations continued through January 1945 until 5 February 1945.

The next combat assignment was Okinawa. In late March (26–29), the division made 15 landings, securing Kerama Retto and Keise Shima for the assault on Okinawa. Riding at sea, 1–15 April 1945, it suffered casualties from enemy suicide attacks, and prepared for the assault landing on Ie Shima. On 16 April 1945, the 77th landed on Ie Shima, captured the airfield, and engaged in a bitter fight for "Government House Hill" and "Bloody Ridge." It was in this operation that Ernie Pyle was killed. On April 25, it left Ie Shima for Okinawa, relieving the 96th Infantry Division on 1 May 1945. Fighting its way slowly against extremely heavy Japanese resistance, the division drove to Shuri in conjunction with the 1st Marine Division, occupying it 29–31 May. In June the division covered the right flank of XXIV Corps and "sealed" Japanese cave positions. In July the division moved to Cebu, Philippine Islands, and prepared for the anticipated invasion of Japan (Operation Downfall). On 6 and 9 August 1945, the U.S. dropped atomic bombs on Hiroshima and Nagasaki, forcing the surrender of Japan and thereby cancelling Operation Downfall. The division landed in Japan in October 1945 for occupation duty, and was inactivated a few months later on 15 March 1946.

==== Casualties ====
- Total battle casualties: 7,461
- Killed in action: 1,449
- Wounded in action: 5,935
- Missing in action: 76
- Prisoner of war: 27

=== Post-war ===
From 1947 to 1965, the 77th Infantry Division was one of the six combat divisions in the Army Reserve. The 77th Army Reserve Command (ARCOM) was formed in December 1967 after Secretary McNamara ordered a reduction in the number of USAR combat divisions. Since 1968, the 77th ARCOM and its successors were headquartered in Bayside, Queens, New York at Fort Totten.

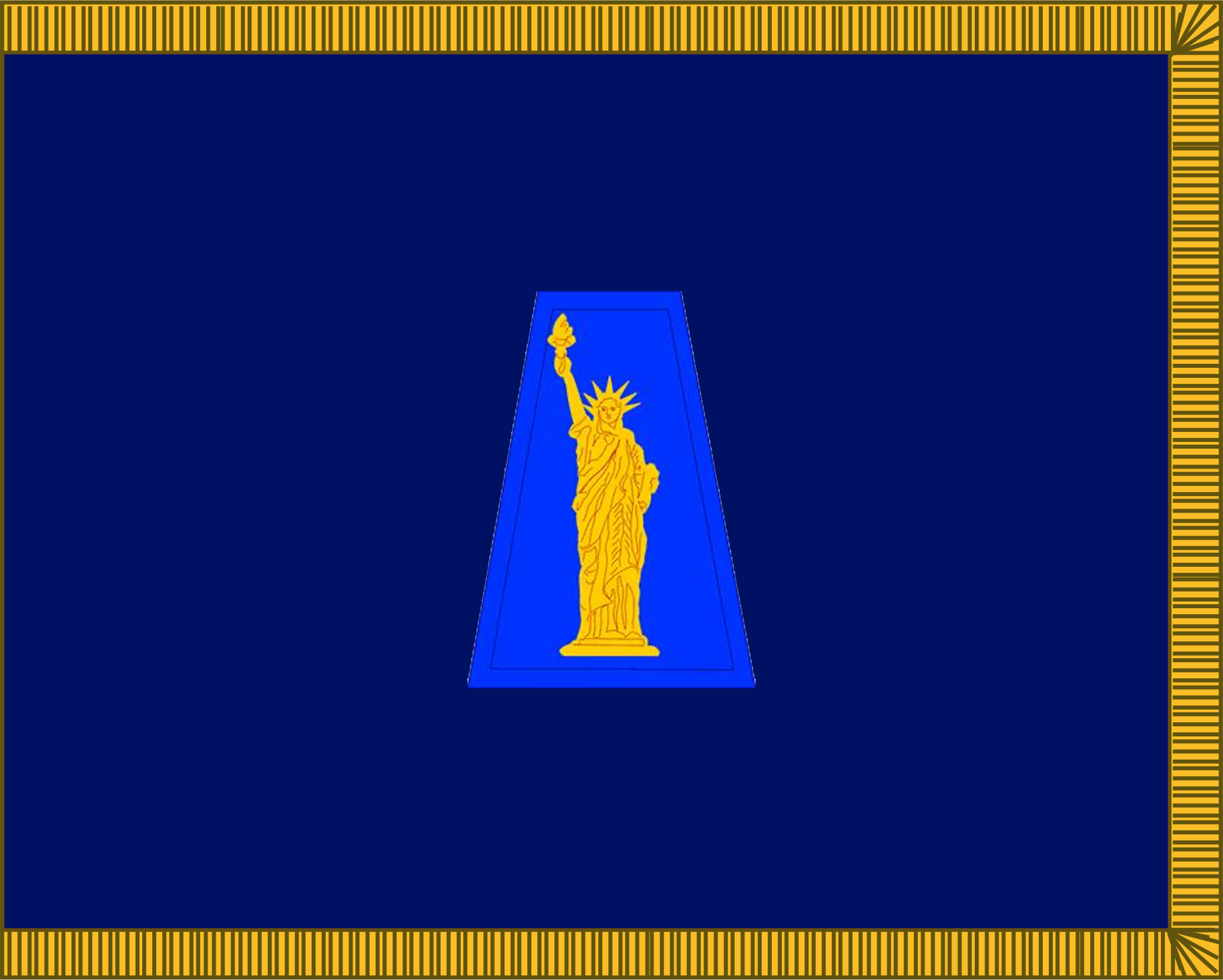
77th Regional Readiness Command Flag

The 77th ARCOM was reorganized into the 77th Regional Support Command on October 1, 1995. In wartime, the 77th RRC would assist Reserve unit mobilization; in peacetime, it was tasked to support the Federal Emergency Management Agency, if natural or manmade disasters occurred. Five soldiers from the 77th Regional Support Command lost their lives at the World Trade Center in the September 11 attacks, while serving in their civilian duties.

In late 2003 all Regional Support Commands were re-designated to Regional Readiness Commands. The Department of Defense, in its 2005 BRAC recommendations, recommended the disestablishment of the unit (see below).

The lineage of the 77th Infantry Division is perpetuated today by the 77th Sustainment Brigade, a unit of the United States Army Reserve. Its headquarters has been at Fort Dix, New Jersey (Joint Base McGuire-Dix-Lakehurst), since its predecessor command, the 77th Regional Readiness Command, was disestablished in 2008 from Fort Totten in Bayside, Queens, New York.

In 2011, the brigade deployed to Iraq towards the end of the Iraq War (U.S. phase, 2003-11). By this time the operation name was "New Dawn." The brigade headquarters was stationed in Joint Base Balad, Iraq and held logistical responsibility for the re-posturing of forces in northern Iraq. One of the unit's nicknames is "Liberty Warriors".

== Organization ==
The brigade is a subordinate unit of the 316th Expeditionary Sustainment Command. As of January 2026 the brigade consists of the following units:

- 77th Sustainment Brigade, at Joint Base McGuire-Dix-Lakehurst (NJ)
  - 77th Special Troops Battalion, at Joint Base McGuire-Dix-Lakehurst (NJ)
    - Headquarters and Headquarters Company, 77th Sustainment Brigade, at Joint Base McGuire-Dix-Lakehurst (NJ)
    - 404th Brigade Signal Company (MEB/CAB/SB), at Joint Base McGuire–Dix–Lakehurst (NJ)
  - 354th Transportation Battalion (Movement Control), at Fort Totten (NY)
    - Headquarters and Headquarters Detachment, 354th Transportation Battalion (Movement Control), at Fort Totten (NY)
    - 139th Transportation Detachment (Movement Control Team), at Fort Totten (NY)
    - 140th Quartermaster Company (Field Service) (Modular), at Fort Totten (NY)
    - 142nd Transportation Detachment (Movement Control Team), at Fort Totten (NY)
    - 237th Ordnance Company (Support Maintenance), at Fort Totten (NY)
    - 773rd Transportation Medium Truck Company (POL, 5K GAL) (EAB Linehaul), at Fort Totten (NY)
  - 389th Combat Sustainment Support Battalion, at Fort Totten (NY)
    - Headquarters and Headquarters Company, 389th Combat Sustainment Support Battalion, at Fort Totten (NY)
    - 77th Human Resources Company, in Amherst (NY)
    - 316th Adjutant General Detachment (Military Mail Terminal), at Fort Totten (NY)
    - 408th Human Resources Company, at Fort Totten (NY)
      - 3rd Platoon, 408th Human Resources Company, in Shoreham (NY)
      - 5th Platoon, 408th Human Resources Company, in Tonawanda (NY)
    - 1019th Quartermaster Company (Mortuary Affairs), at Fort Wadsworth (NY)
  - 436th Transportation Battalion (Movement Control), at Fort Wadsworth (NY)
    - Headquarters and Headquarters Detachment, 436th Transportation Battalion (Movement Control), at Fort Wadsworth (NY)
    - 716th Quartermaster Company (Petroleum Support), in Jersey City (NJ)
      - 2nd Platoon, 716th Quartermaster Company (Petroleum Support), in Blackwood (NJ)
    - 874th Transportation Detachment (Movement Control Team), at Fort Wadsworth (NY)
    - 961st Transportation Detachment (Movement Control Team), at Fort Wadsworth (NY)
    - 976th Transportation Detachment (Movement Control Team), at Fort Wadsworth (NY)
  - 462nd Transportation Battalion (Movement Control), in Trenton (NJ)
    - Headquarters and Headquarters Detachment, 462nd Transportation Battalion (Movement Control), in Trenton (NJ)
    - 427th Transportation Detachment (Movement Control Team), at Biddle Air National Guard Base (PA)
    - 445th Quartermaster Company (Field Service) (Modular), in Trenton (NJ)
    - 579th Transportation Company (Inland Cargo Transfer Company — ICTC), at Joint Base McGuire–Dix–Lakehurst (NJ)
    - 947th Quartermaster Company (Petroleum Support), at Letterkenny Army Depot (PA)

Abbreviations: POL — Petroleum Oil Lubricants; EAB — Echelon Above Brigade

== See also ==
- Desmond Doss: combat medic of the 77th who received the Medal of Honor during the Battle of Okinawa
- Martin O. May: machine gunner who refused to withdraw and broke up multiple enemy attacks during combat operations on Ie-shima during the Battle of Okinawa. Posthumously awarded the Medal of Honor
- Joseph E. Muller: sergeant who received the Medal of Honor posthumously for small unit leadership and throwing himself on a grenade to save two soldiers during Battle of Okinawa combat operations
- Robert B. Nett: during Battle of Leyte combat operations, then-Lt. Nett led an infantry company attack against an enemy battalion position, killed several enemy soldiers and was wounded multiple times. He received the Medal of Honor
