= Julius Ochs Adler =

United States Army general (1892–1955)

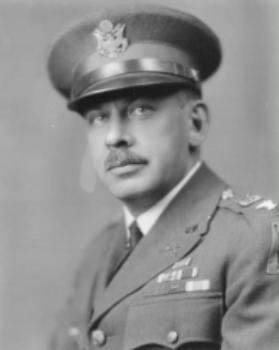
- Born: December 3, 1892; Chattanooga, Tennessee, US
- Died: October 3, 1955 (aged 62); New York City, US
- Burial place: Arlington National Cemetery
- Spouse: Barbara Stettheimer
- Children: Barbara A. Katzander; Nancy J. Adler; Julius Ochs Adler, Jr.
- Relatives: Adolph Ochs (uncle)
- Military career
- Allegiance: United States of America
- Branch: United States Army
- Service years: 1917–1954
- Rank: Major general
- Unit: Infantry Branch
- Commands: 77th Infantry Division; 113th Infantry Regiment; 306th Infantry Regiment
- Conflicts: World War I: Meuse–Argonne offensive; World War II: New Guinea campaign
- Awards: Distinguished Service Cross; Silver Star (2); Legion of Merit; Bronze Star Medal; Purple Heart

Julius Ochs Adler (December 3, 1892 – October 3, 1955) was an American publisher, journalist, and highly decorated United States Army officer with the rank of major general. He distinguished himself during World War I as Major and battalion commander in the 306th Infantry Regiment and received Distinguished Service Cross, the second highest decorations of the United States military for valor in combat.

Following the War, he returned to his civilian job as journalist for The New York Times, but retained his reserve commission. Adler was recalled for federal service in 1940 and reached the rank of Brigadier general. He later served as Assistant Division Commander, 6th Infantry Division during New Guinea campaign, but reverted to the inactive status in late 1944. However Adler remained active in the Army Organized Reserve and reached the rank of major general and commander of 77th Infantry Division.

== Early career and World War I ==
Julius O. Adler was born on December 3, 1892, in Chattanooga, Tennessee, the son of Harry Clay Adler and Ada Ochs. He graduated from Baylor University School in Chattanooga in 1908 and then entered the Lawrenceville School in Lawrenceville, New Jersey, which he completed in summer 1910. Adler was then admitted to the Princeton University from which he graduated with Bachelor of Arts degree in June 1914. Upon his graduation, he joined the staff of The New York Times.

His first military experience came in 1915, when he entered the Citizens' Military Training Camp, the first businessmen's training camp at Plattsburgh, New York. Adler participated regularly in the summer military trainings at the Governors Island and was commissioned second lieutenant in the Cavalry on April 7, 1917, the day after the American entry into World War I. He was called up to active service shortly thereafter and rose to the rank of captain by the end of August 1917.

Adler was transferred to the Infantry Branch and joined the 306th Infantry Regiment at Camp Upton, New York as Commander of "Company H". Following several months of intensive training, he embarked with the regiment as the part of 77th Division for Western Front in April 1918. Adler was promoted to major and assumed command of the battalion, which he led during the Oise-Aisne, Meuse-Argonne, Champagne, and Lorraine campaigns.

On October 14, 1918, during the Meuse–Argonne offensive, Adler accompanied by fellow officer supervised the work of clearing the enemy from Saint-Juvin in the Ardennes department in northern France. They suddenly came upon a party of the enemy numbering 150 Germans. Adler, armed only with his pistol, opened the fire on the enemy and ran toward the party, calling on them to surrender. His bravery and good marksmanship resulted in the capture of 50 Germans, and the remainder fled. For this act of valor, Adler was decorated with Distinguished Service Cross, the second highest decorations of the United States military for valor in combat.

He was also decorated with two Silver Stars citation for bravery and received Purple Heart for wounds received by combat gas. The Allies bestowed him Legion of Honour, French Croix de guerre 1914–1918 with Palm and Italian War Merit Cross. The State of New York decorated him with New York Meritorious Service Medal.

== Interwar period ==
Adler returned stateside in April 1919 and reverted to the inactive status on May 10, 1919. He retain his reserve commission in the 306th Infantry Regiment and returned to his job with The New York Times. He become treasurer and vice-president of The New York Times and following the death of his uncle, Adolph Ochs, in April 1935, he was appointed General Manager of The Times. Adler was promoted to lieutenant colonel in 1923 and to colonel in 1930 in the Army Reserve. He assumed command of 306th Infantry Regiment in the Army Reserves in December 1924 and held it until his reactivation in October 1940.

Meanwhile in April 1932, Adler was appointed civilian aide to the Secretary of War, Patrick J. Hurley in connection with Citizens' Military Training Camp for Second Corps Area under Major general Dennis E. Nolan. For his contribution as a Princeton graduate to journalism or related fields, Adler became the second recipient of the medal awarded annually by the Daily Princetonian Alumni Association.

Adler participated in the pre-World War II defense program and in May 1940, he was appointed Head of the committee of representatives from New York, New Jersey and Delaware, which was responsible for the direction of the registration of 7,200 youths for the Citizens' Military Training Camps. Adler also urged Secretary of the Navy, Frank Knox, with the adoption of compulsory military training.

== World War II ==
Adler was reactivated at his own request in October 1940 and appointed commanding officer of the 113th Infantry Regiment, 44th Division, at Fort Dix, New Jersey. After several months with that regiment, he was promoted to the temporary rank of brigadier general on July 15, 1941 and assumed duty as the assistant division commander of the 6th Infantry Division, commanded at the time by Major General Franklin C. Sibert.

He participated in the division's desert training in California and embarked with the division to Hawaii in July 1943, some 18 months after America's entry into World War II, for defense of the islands. Adler participated in the coordination of the defense plans of Oahu and received the Bronze Star. The 6th Division then conducted intensive jungle training for the next six months, when it received orders to reinforce allied units in the Southwest Pacific. Adler participated in the New Guinea campaign until June 1944, when he became ill and was shipped to the United States for treatment.

Unfortunately his illness was so serious, Adler was declared unfit for further active duty and reverted to an inactive status on November 17, 1944. His service with the 6th Infantry Division on New Guinea did not go entirely unrecognized, however, as he was awarded the Legion of Merit.

== Postwar career ==
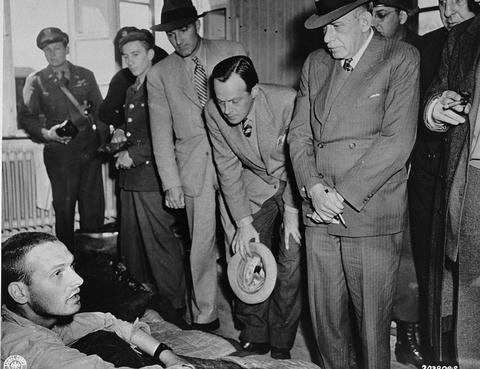
American newspaper editors speak with survivors at a hospital in the newly liberated Buchenwald concentration camp, April 1945. Left to right: Norman Chandler, Los Angeles Times; William I. Nichols (leaning forward, center), This Week magazine; and Julius Ochs Adler, The New York Times.

Adler returned to his job with The New York Times as general manager and also resumed his work as the president and publisher of The Chattanooga Times. Following on from the surrender of Nazi Germany in May 1945, Adler and several other newspapers executive, visited concentration camps in Germany at the invitation of General Dwight D. Eisenhower, the Supreme Allied Commander in Western Europe. Another tour of duty came in August and September 1945, when he was invited by Secretary of the Navy, James V. Forrestal, to the Pacific Theater of Operations to obtain firsthand observation of the military operations. While in the Pacific, Japan surrendered and Adler filed dispatches to his newspaper aboard the U.S. warships in Tokyo Bay.

Following the activation of the 77th Infantry Division as the part of Army Organized Reserve, General Courtney Hodges, commander of the First Army, appointed Adler as 77th Division's new commanding general. Adler commanded his division during the postwar training period at Camp Kilmer, New Jersey, and received promotion to major general on January 24, 1948. He also served as the President of the Senior Army Reserve Commanders Association, 1949–1951 and a Reserve member of the Components Policy Board.

Adler was the president and publisher of The Chattanooga Times, and general manager of The New York Times until his death at the relatively young age of 62 on October 3, 1955. He was buried at Arlington National Cemetery.

== Personal life ==
Adler married to Barbara Stettheimer in 1922. They had two daughters, Barbara A. Katzander and Nancy J. Adler, and a son, Julius Ochs Adler, Jr.

Adler was a Freemason. He was a member of Justice Lodge No 753 of the 6th Manhattan Masonic District in New York City.

Adler was a nephew of publisher Adolph Ochs.

== Decorations ==
Here is Major general Adler's ribbon bar:

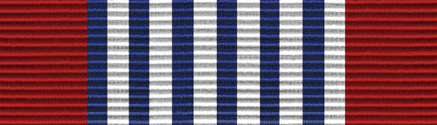

1st Row	Distinguished Service Cross		Silver Star	
2nd Row	Legion of Merit	Bronze Star Medal	Purple Heart	World War I Victory Medal with three battle clasps
3rd Row	American Defense Service Medal	American Campaign Medal	Asiatic–Pacific Campaign Medal with two 3/16 inch service stars	World War II Victory Medal
4th Row	Chevalier of the Legion of Honour (France)	French Croix de guerre 1914–1918 with Palm	Croce al Merito di Guerra (Italy)	New York Meritorious Service Medal

=== Distinguished Service Cross citation ===
The President of the United States of America, authorized by Act of Congress, July 9, 1918, takes pleasure in presenting the Distinguished Service Cross to Major (Infantry) Julius O. Adler, United States Army, for extraordinary heroism in action while serving with 306th Infantry Regiment, 77th Division, A.E.F., at St. Juvin, France, 14 October 1918. Accompanied by another officer, Major Adler was supervising the work of clearing the enemy from St. Juvin where they suddenly came upon a party of the enemy numbering 150. Firing on the enemy with his pistol, Major Adler ran toward the party, calling on them to surrender. His bravery and good marksmanship resulted in the capture of 50 Germans, and the remainder fled.

=== Legion of Merit citation ===
The President of the United States of America, authorized by Act of Congress, 20 July 1942, takes pleasure in presenting the Legion of Merit to Brigadier General Julius Ochs Adler, United States Army, for exceptionally meritorious conduct in the performance of outstanding services to the Government of the United States as Assistant Commanding General, 6th Infantry Division, from September 1941 to September 1943 and from January to June 1944.

== Publications ==
- History of the Seventy-Seventh Division, August 25th, 1917 – November 11th, 1918 (1919) (ed.)
- History of the 306th Infantry (1935) (ed.)

== See also ==
- List of Jewish Americans in the military
