= ACE model =

Statistical model

The ACE model is a statistical model commonly used to analyze the results of twin and adoption studies. This classic behaviour genetic model aims to partition the phenotypic variance into three categories: additive genetic variance (A), common (or shared) environmental factors (C), and specific (or nonshared) environmental factors plus measurement error (E). It is widely used in genetic epidemiology and behavioural genetics. The basic ACE model relies on several assumptions, including the absence of assortative mating, that there is no genetic dominance or epistasis, that all genetic effects are additive, and the absence of gene-environment interactions. In order to address these limitations, several variants of the ACE model have been developed, including an ACE-β model, which emphasizes the identification of causal effects, and the ACDE model, which accounts for the effects of genetic dominance.

== See also ==
- ADE model
