= ADE model =

Genetic model for twin studies

An ADE model is a genetic model for twin studies which includes dominance genetic effects.

A stands for additive genetic effects, D for non-additive genetic (or dominance) effects, and E for nonshared environment effects.

== See also ==
- ACE model
