= Interactionism (disambiguation) =

Interactionism is a sociological perspective regarding human interaction.

Interactionism may also refer to:

- Interactionism (nature versus nurture), the view that behavioral development occurs as a result of the inseparable interaction between nature and nurture
- Interactionism (philosophy of mind), a perspective in the philosophy of mind
- Symbolic interactionism, a sociological and psychological theory regarding communication and interaction between persons as basis for the development of mind.
