= Nature versus nurture =

Long-standing debate in biology and society

Nature versus nurture is a long-standing debate in biology, psychology, and social sciences about whether human individuals receive more influence from their genetic inheritance and biology ("nature") or from their environment and upbringing ("nurture"). In other words, the disagreement involves whether a person's disposition, behavior, personality, sense of self, etc. is more determined by their internal genetically and biologically inherited traits or by external factors after conception, e.g. their exposure, life experience, and learning.

The phrase in its modern sense was popularized by the Victorian polymath Francis Galton, the modern founder of eugenics and behavioral genetics when he was discussing the influence of heredity and environment on social advancement. Galton was influenced by On the Origin of Species written by his half-cousin, the evolutionary biologist Charles Darwin. The complementary combination of the two concepts is an ancient concept (Ancient Greek: ἁπό φύσεως καὶ εὐτροφίας).

The view that humans acquire all or almost all their behavioral traits from "nurture" was termed tabula rasa ('blank tablet, slate') by John Locke in 1690. A blank slate view (sometimes termed blank-slatism) in human developmental psychology, which assumes that human behavioral traits develop almost exclusively from environmental influences, was widely held during much of the 20th century. The debate between "blank-slate" denial of the influence of heritability, and the view admitting both environmental and heritable traits, was at the core of an ideological dispute over research agendas throughout the second half of the 20th century.

Today, the idea of a strong dichotomy of nature versus nurture is generally considered to have limited relevance. Both "nature" and "nurture" factors have been found to contribute substantially, often in an inextricable manner, to many processes studied by biologists, psychologists and anthropologists. Feedback loops have been found in which nature and nurture influence one another constantly, as seen in self-domestication. In ecology and behavioral genetics, researchers posit that nurture has an essential influence on the nature of an individual. Similarly in other fields, the dividing line between an inherited and an acquired trait has become unclear, as in epigenetics and fetal development.

== History of the debate ==
According to Records of the Grand Historian (94 BC) by Sima Qian, during Chen Sheng Wu Guang uprising in 209 B.C., Chen Sheng asked the rhetorical question as a call to war: "Are kings, generals, and ministers merely born into their kind?" (Chinese: 王侯將相寧有種乎). Though Chen was obviously negative to the question, the phrase has often been cited as an early quest into the nature versus nurture problem.

John Locke's An Essay Concerning Human Understanding (1690) is often cited as the foundational document of the blank slate view. In the Essay, Locke specifically criticizes René Descartes's claim of an innate idea of God that is universal to humanity. Locke's view was harshly criticized in his own time. Anthony Ashley-Cooper, 3rd Earl of Shaftesbury, complained that by denying the possibility of any innate ideas, Locke "threw all order and virtue out of the world," leading to total moral relativism. By the 19th century, the predominant perspective was contrary to that of Locke's, tending to focus on "instinct." Leda Cosmides and John Tooby noted that William James (1842–1910) argued that humans have more instincts than animals, and that greater freedom of action is the result of having more psychological instincts, not fewer.

The question of "innate ideas" or "instincts" was of some importance in the discussion of free will in moral philosophy. In 18th-century philosophy, this was cast in terms of "innate ideas" establishing the presence of a universal virtue, a prerequisite for objective morals. In the 20th century, this argument was in a way inverted, since some philosophers (J. L. Mackie) now argued that the evolutionary origins of human behavioral traits forces us to concede that there is no foundation for ethics, while others (Thomas Nagel) treated ethics as a field of cognitively valid statements in complete isolation from evolutionary considerations.

=== Early to mid-20th century ===
In the early 20th century, there was an increased interest in the role of one's environment, as a reaction to the strong focus on pure heredity in the wake of the triumphal success of Darwin's theory of evolution. During this time, the social sciences developed as the project of studying the influence of culture in clean isolation from questions related to biology. Franz Boas's The Mind of Primitive Man (1911) established a program that would dominate American anthropology for the next 15 years. In this study, he established that in any given population, biology, language, material, and symbolic culture, are autonomous; that each is an equally important dimension of human nature, but that none of these dimensions is reducible to another.

==== Purist behaviorism ====
John B. Watson in the 1920s and 1930s established the school of purist behaviorism that would become dominant over the following decades. Watson is often said to have been convinced of the complete dominance of cultural influence over anything that heredity might contribute. This is based on the following quote which is frequently repeated without context, as the last sentence is frequently omitted, leading to confusion about Watson's position:

Give me a dozen healthy infants, well-formed, and my own specified world to bring them up in and I'll guarantee to take any one at random and train him to become any type of specialist I might select – doctor, lawyer, artist, merchant-chief and, yes, even beggar-man and thief, regardless of his talents, penchants, tendencies, abilities, vocations, and race of his ancestors. I am going beyond my facts and I admit it, but so have the advocates of the contrary and they have been doing it for many thousands of years.

During the 1940s to 1960s, Ashley Montagu was a notable proponent of this purist form of behaviorism which allowed no contribution from heredity whatsoever:

Man is man because he has no instincts, because everything he is and has become he has learned, acquired, from his culture ... with the exception of the instinctoid reactions in infants to sudden withdrawals of support and to sudden loud noises, the human being is entirely instinctless.

In 1951, Calvin Hall suggested that the dichotomy opposing nature to nurture is ultimately fruitless.

In African Genesis (1961) and The Territorial Imperative (1966), Robert Ardrey argues for innate attributes of human nature, especially concerning territoriality. Desmond Morris in The Naked Ape (1967) expresses similar views. Organised opposition to Montagu's kind of purist "blank-slatism" began to pick up in the 1970s, notably led by E. O. Wilson (On Human Nature, 1979).

The tool of twin studies was developed as a research design intended to exclude all confounders based on inherited behavioral traits. Such studies are designed to decompose the variability of a given trait in a given population into a genetic and an environmental component. Studies using twin neuroimaging methods show that genetic elements explain more of the variation in cognitive processing than in emotional regulation, which indicates that environmental factors play a greater role in shaping affective traits. Twin studies established that there was, in many cases, a significant heritable component. These results did not, in any way, point to overwhelming contribution of heritable factors, with heritability typically ranging around 40% to 50%, so that the controversy may not be cast in terms of purist behaviorism vs. purist nativism. Rather, it was purist behaviorism that was gradually replaced by the now-predominant view that both kinds of factors usually contribute to a given trait, anecdotally phrased by Donald Hebb as an answer to the question "which, nature or nurture, contributes more to personality?" by asking in response, "Which contributes more to the area of a rectangle, its length or its width?"

In a comparable avenue of research, anthropologist Donald Brown in the 1980s surveyed hundreds of anthropological studies from around the world and collected a set of cultural universals. He identified approximately 150 such features, coming to the conclusion there is indeed a "universal human nature", and that these features point to what that universal human nature is.

==== Determinism ====
At the height of the controversy, during the 1970s to 1980s, the debate was highly ideologised. In Not in Our Genes: Biology, Ideology and Human Nature (1984), Richard Lewontin, Steven Rose and Leon Kamin criticise "genetic determinism" from a Marxist framework, arguing that "Science is the ultimate legitimator of bourgeois ideology ... If biological determinism is a weapon in the struggle between classes, then the universities are weapons factories, and their teaching and research faculties are the engineers, designers, and production workers." The debate thus shifted away from whether heritable traits exist to whether it was politically or ethically permissible to admit their existence. The authors deny this, requesting that evolutionary inclinations be discarded in ethical and political discussions regardless of whether they exist or not.

=== 1990s ===
Heritability studies became much easier to perform, and hence much more numerous, with the advances of genetic studies during the 1990s. By the late 1990s, an overwhelming amount of evidence had accumulated that amounts to a refutation of the extreme forms of "blank-slatism" advocated by Watson or Montagu.

This revised state of affairs was summarized in books aimed at a popular audience from the late 1990s. In The Nurture Assumption: Why Children Turn Out the Way They Do (1998), Judith Rich Harris was heralded by Steven Pinker as a book that "will come to be seen as a turning point in the history of psychology." However, Harris was criticized for exaggerating the point of "parental upbringing seems to matter less than previously thought" to the implication that "parents do not matter."

The situation as it presented itself by the end of the 20th century was summarized in The Blank Slate: The Modern Denial of Human Nature (2002) by Steven Pinker. The book became a best-seller, and was instrumental in bringing to the attention of a wider public the paradigm shift away from the behaviourist purism of the 1940s to 1970s that had taken place over the preceding decades.

Pinker portrays the adherence to pure blank-slatism as an ideological dogma linked to two other dogmas found in the dominant view of human nature in the 20th century:

1. "noble savage", in the sense that people are born good and corrupted by bad influence; and
2. "ghost in the machine", in the sense that there is a human soul capable of moral choices completely detached from biology.

Pinker argues that all three dogmas were held onto for an extended period even in the face of evidence because they were seen as desirable in the sense that if any human trait is purely conditioned by culture, any undesired trait (such as crime or aggression) may be engineered away by purely cultural (political) means. Pinker focuses on reasons he assumes were responsible for unduly repressing evidence to the contrary, notably the fear of (imagined or projected) political or ideological consequences.

== Heritability estimates ==
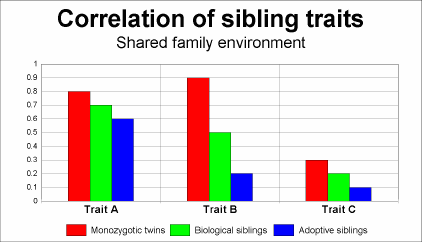
This chart illustrates three patterns one might see when studying the influence of genes and environment on traits in individuals. Trait A shows a high sibling correlation, but little heritability (i.e. high shared environmental variance c^{2}; low heritability h^{2}). Trait B shows a high heritability since the correlation of trait rises sharply with the degree of genetic similarity. Trait C shows low heritability, but also low correlations generally; this means Trait C has a high nonshared environmental variance e^{2}. In other words, the degree to which individuals display Trait C has little to do with either genes or broadly predictable environmental factors—roughly, the outcome approaches random for an individual. Notice also that even identical twins who are raised in a common family rarely show 100% trait correlation.

The term heritability only refers to the degree of genetic variation between people on a trait. It does not refer to the degree to which a trait of a particular individual is due to environmental or genetic factors. The traits of an individual are always a complex interweaving of both. For an individual, even strongly genetically influenced, or "obligate" traits, such as eye color, assume the inputs of a typical environment during ontogenetic development (e.g., certain ranges of temperatures, oxygen levels, etc.).

In contrast, the "heritability index" statistically quantifies the extent to which variation between individuals on a trait is due to variation in the genes those individuals carry. In animals where breeding and environments can be controlled experimentally, heritability can be determined relatively easily. Such experiments would be unethical for human research. This problem can be overcome by finding existing populations of humans that reflect the experimental setting the researcher wishes to create.

One way to determine the contribution of genes and environment to a trait is to study twins. In one kind of study, identical twins reared apart are compared to randomly selected pairs of people. The twins share identical genes, but different family environments. Twins reared apart are not assigned at random to foster or adoptive parents. In another kind of twin study, identical twins reared together (who share family environment and genes) are compared to fraternal twins reared together (who also share family environment but only share half their genes). Another condition that permits the disassociation of genes and environment is adoption. In one kind of adoption study, biological siblings reared together (who share the same family environment and half their genes) are compared to adoptive siblings (who share their family environment but none of their genes).

In many cases, it has been found that genes make a substantial contribution, including psychological traits such as intelligence and personality. Yet heritability may differ in other circumstances, for instance environmental deprivation. Examples of low, medium, and high heritability traits include:

Low heritability	Medium heritability	High heritability
Specific language	Weight	Blood type
Specific religion	Religiosity	Eye color

Twin and adoption studies have their methodological limits. For example, both are limited to the range of environments and genes which they sample. Almost all of these studies are conducted in Western countries, and therefore cannot necessarily be extrapolated globally to include non-western populations. Additionally, both types of studies depend on particular assumptions, such as the equal environments assumption in the case of twin studies, and the lack of pre-adoptive effects in the case of adoption studies.

Since the definition of "nature" in this context is tied to "heritability", the definition of "nurture" has consequently become very wide, including any type of causality that is not heritable. The term has thus moved away from its original connotation of "cultural influences" to include all effects of the environment; indeed, a substantial source of environmental input to human nature may arise from stochastic variations in prenatal development and is thus in no sense of the term "cultural".

== Gene–environment interaction ==
Many properties of the brain are genetically organized, and don't depend on information coming in from the senses.

— Steven Pinker

The interactions of genes with environment, called gene–environment interactions, are another component of the nature–nurture debate. A classic example of gene–environment interaction is the ability of a diet low in the amino acid phenylalanine to partially suppress the genetic disease phenylketonuria. Yet another complication to the nature–nurture debate is the existence of gene–environment correlations. These correlations indicate that individuals with certain genotypes are more likely to find themselves in certain environments. Thus, it appears that genes can shape (the selection or creation of) environments. Even using experiments like those described above, it can be very difficult to determine convincingly the relative contribution of genes and environment. The analogy "genetics loads the gun, but environment pulls the trigger" has been attributed to Judith Stern.

Heritability refers to the origins of differences between people. Individual development, even of highly heritable traits, such as eye color, depends on a range of environmental factors, from the other genes in the organism, to physical variables such as temperature, oxygen levels etc. during its development or ontogenesis.

The variability of trait can be meaningfully spoken of as being due in certain proportions to genetic differences ("nature"), or environments ("nurture"). For highly penetrant Mendelian genetic disorders such as Huntington's disease virtually all the incidence of the disease is due to genetic differences. Huntington's animal models live much longer or shorter lives depending on how they are cared for.

At a molecular level, genes interact with signals from other genes and from the environment. While there are many thousands of single-gene-locus traits, so-called complex traits are due to the additive effects of many (often hundreds) of small gene effects. A good example of this is height, where variance appears to be spread across many hundreds of loci.

Extreme genetic or environmental conditions can predominate in rare circumstances—if a child is born mute due to a genetic mutation, it will not learn to speak any language regardless of the environment; similarly, someone who is practically certain to eventually develop Huntington's disease according to their genotype may die in an unrelated accident (an environmental event) long before the disease will manifest itself.

The "two buckets" view of heritability

More realistic "homogenous mudpie" view of heritability

Steven Pinker likewise described several examples:

[C]oncrete behavioral traits that patently depend on content provided by the home or culture—which language one speaks, which religion one practices, which political party one supports—are not heritable at all. But traits that reflect the underlying talents and temperaments—how proficient with language a person is, how religious, how liberal or conservative—are partially heritable.

When traits are determined by a complex interaction of genotype and environment it is possible to measure the heritability of a trait within a population. However, many non-scientists who encounter a report of a trait having a certain percentage heritability imagine non-interactional, additive contributions of genes and environment to the trait. As an analogy, some laypeople may think of the degree of a trait being made up of two "buckets," genes and environment, each able to hold a certain capacity of the trait. But even for intermediate heritabilities, a trait is always shaped by both genetic dispositions and the environments in which people develop, merely with greater and lesser plasticities associated with these heritability measures.

Heritability measures always refer to the degree of variation between individuals in a population. That is, as these statistics cannot be applied at the level of the individual, it would be incorrect to say that while the heritability index of personality is about 0.6, 60% of one's personality is obtained from one's parents and 40% from the environment. To help to understand this, imagine that all humans were genetic clones. The heritability index for all traits would be zero (all variability between clonal individuals must be due to environmental factors). And, contrary to erroneous interpretations of the heritability index, as societies become more egalitarian (everyone has more similar experiences) the heritability index goes up (as environments become more similar, variability between individuals is due more to genetic factors).

One should also take into account the fact that the variables of heritability and environmentality are not precise and vary within a chosen population and across cultures. It would be more accurate to state that the degree of heritability and environmentality is measured in its reference to a particular phenotype in a chosen group of a population in a given period of time. The accuracy of the calculations is further hindered by the number of coefficients taken into consideration, age being one such variable. The display of the influence of heritability and environmentality differs drastically across age groups: the older the studied age is, the more noticeable the heritability factor becomes, the younger the test subjects are, the more likely it is to show signs of strong influence of the environmental factors.

For example, one study found no statistically significant difference in self-reported wellbeing between middle-aged monozygotic twins separated at birth and those reared in the same household, suggesting that happiness in middle-aged adults is not based in environmental factors related to family rearing. The same result was also found among middle-aged dizygotic twins. Furthermore, there was significantly more variance in the dizygotic twins' self-reported wellbeing than there was in the monozygotic group. Genetic similarity has thus been estimated to account for around 50% of the variance in adult happiness at a given point in time, and as much as 80% of the variance in long-term happiness stability. Other studies have similarly found the heritability of happiness to be around 0.35–0.50.

Some have pointed out that environmental inputs affect the expression of genes. This is one explanation of how environment can influence the extent to which a genetic disposition will actually manifest.

=== Obligate vs. facultative adaptations ===
Traits may be considered to be adaptations (such as the umbilical cord), byproducts of adaptations (the belly button) or due to random variation (convex or concave belly button shape). An alternative to contrasting nature and nurture focuses on "obligate vs. facultative" adaptations. Adaptations may be generally more obligate (robust in the face of typical environmental variation) or more facultative (sensitive to typical environmental variation). For example, the rewarding sweet taste of sugar and the pain of bodily injury are obligate psychological adaptations—typical environmental variability during development does not much affect their operation.

On the other hand, facultative adaptations are somewhat like "if-then" statements. An example of a facultative psychological adaptation may be adult attachment style. The attachment style of adults, (for example, a "secure attachment style," the propensity to develop close, trusting bonds with others) is proposed to be conditional on whether an individual's early childhood caregivers could be trusted to provide reliable assistance and attention. An example of a facultative physiological adaptation is tanning of skin on exposure to sunlight (to prevent skin damage). Facultative social adaptation have also been proposed. For example, whether a society is warlike or peaceful has been proposed to be conditional on how much collective threat that society is experiencing.

=== Advanced techniques ===
Quantitative studies of heritable traits throw light on the question.

Developmental genetic analysis examines the effects of genes over the course of a human lifespan. Early studies of intelligence, which mostly examined young children, found that heritability measured 40–50%. Subsequent developmental genetic analyses found that variance attributable to additive environmental effects is less apparent in older individuals, with estimated heritability of IQ increasing in adulthood.

Multivariate genetic analysis examines the genetic contribution to several traits that vary together. For example, multivariate genetic analysis has demonstrated that the genetic determinants of all specific cognitive abilities (e.g., memory, spatial reasoning, processing speed) overlap greatly, such that the genes associated with any specific cognitive ability will affect all others. Similarly, multivariate genetic analysis has found that genes that affect scholastic achievement overlap substantially with the genes that affect cognitive ability.

Extremes analysis examines the link between normal and pathological traits. For example, it is hypothesized that a given behavioral disorder may represent an extreme of a continuous distribution of a normal behavior and hence an extreme of a continuous distribution of genetic and environmental variation. Depression, phobias, and reading disabilities have been examined in this context.

For a few highly heritable traits, studies have identified loci associated with variance in that trait, for instance in some individuals with schizophrenia. New research is showing that gene expression can happen in adults due to environmental stimuli. For example, people with schizophrenic gene have a genetic predisposition for this illness but the gene lays dormant in most people. However, if introduced to chronic stress or introducing some amphetamines it caused the methyl groups to stick to hippocampi histones.

== Intelligence ==
=== Heritability of intelligence ===
Cognitive functions have a significant genetic component. A 2015 meta-analysis of over 14 million twin pairs found that genetics explained 57% of the variability in cognitive functions. Evidence from behavioral genetic research suggests that family environmental factors may have an effect upon childhood IQ, accounting for up to a quarter of the variance. The American Psychological Association's report "Intelligence: Knowns and Unknowns" (1995) states that there is no doubt that normal child development requires a certain minimum level of responsible care. Here, environment is playing a role in what is believed to be fully genetic (intelligence) but it was found that severely deprived, neglectful, or abusive environments have highly negative effects on many aspects of children's intellect development. Beyond that minimum, however, the role of family experience is in serious dispute. On the other hand, by late adolescence this correlation disappears, such that adoptive siblings no longer have similar IQ scores.

Moreover, adoption studies indicate that, by adulthood, adoptive siblings are no more similar in IQ than strangers (IQ correlation near zero), while full siblings show an IQ correlation of 0.6. Twin studies reinforce this pattern: monozygotic (identical) twins raised separately are highly similar in IQ (0.74), more so than dizygotic (fraternal) twins raised together (0.6) and much more than adoptive siblings (≈0.0). Recent adoption studies also found that supportive parents can have a positive effect on the development of their children.

=== Environment's effect on IQ ===
Other studies have focused on environmental factors that may affect IQ. For example, research has shown that factors such as access to education, nutrition, and social support can have a significant impact on IQ. Recent research shows that children who spend time in nature develop better executive functioning and attention skills according to recent meta-analytic studies although the results show small effects that vary between studies. A study examining the brain-wide associations of hundreds of environmental and phenotypic factors showed socioeconomic status and IQ to have similar brain patterns linked to arousal, sleep deprivation and stress, with socioeconomic status having the stronger brain links, relative to IQ.

== Personality traits ==
Personality is a frequently cited example of a heritable trait that has been studied in twins and adoptees using behavioral genetic study designs. The most famous categorical organization of heritable personality traits were defined in the 1970s by two research teams led by Paul Costa & Robert R. McCrae and Warren Norman & Lewis Goldberg in which they had people rate their personalities on over 1,000 dimensions, which they then narrowed down into the "Big Five" factors of personality—openness, conscientiousness, extraversion, agreeableness, and neuroticism. Studies have found that extraversion has a genetic component, with estimates of heritability ranging from 30% to 50%. The close genetic relationship between positive personality traits and, for example, our happiness traits are the mirror images of comorbidity in psychopathology. These personality factors were consistent across cultures, and many studies have also tested the heritability of these traits. Personal agency also factors into this debate. While genetic and environmental factors can shape personality, individuals also have agency in shaping their own personality through their choices, behaviors, and attitudes. For example, one study found that college students who participated in study abroad programs scored higher on measures of openness to experience compared to those who did not participate. Another study found that individuals who lived in diverse neighborhoods were more likely to score higher on openness to experience compared to those who lived in more homogenous neighborhoods.

Identical twins reared apart are far more similar in personality than randomly selected pairs of people. Likewise, identical twins are more similar than fraternal twins. Also, biological siblings are more similar in personality than adoptive siblings. Each observation suggests that personality is heritable to a certain extent. A supporting article had focused on the heritability of personality (which is estimated to be around 50% for subjective well-being) in which a study was conducted using a representative sample of 973 twin pairs to test the heritable differences in subjective well-being which were found to be fully accounted for by the genetic model of the Five-Factor Model's personality domains. However, these same study designs allow for the examination of environment as well as genes.

Adoption studies also directly measure the strength of shared family effects. Adopted siblings share only family environment. Most adoption studies indicate that by adulthood the personalities of adopted siblings are little or no more similar than random pairs of strangers. This would mean that shared family effects on personality are zero by adulthood.

In the case of personality traits, non-shared environmental effects are often found to out-weigh shared environmental effects. That is, environmental effects that are typically thought to be life-shaping (such as family life) may have less of an impact than non-shared effects, which are harder to identify. One possible source of non-shared effects is the environment of pre-natal development. Random variations in the genetic program of development may be a substantial source of non-shared environment. These results suggest that "nurture" may not be the predominant factor in "environment". Environment and our situations, do in fact impact our lives, but not the way in which we would typically react to these environmental factors. We are preset with personality traits that are the basis for how we would react to situations. An example would be how extraverted prisoners become less happy than introverted prisoners and would react to their incarceration more negatively due to their preset extraverted personality. Behavioral genes are somewhat proven to exist when we take a look at fraternal twins. When fraternal twins are reared apart, they show the same similarities in behavior and response as if they have been reared together.

== Genetics ==
The relationship between personality and people's own well-being is influenced and mediated by genes. There has been found to be a stable set point for happiness that is characteristic of the individual (largely determined by the individual's genes). Happiness fluctuates around that setpoint (again, genetically determined) based on whether good things or bad things are happening to us ("nurture"), but only fluctuates in small magnitude in a normal human. The midpoint of these fluctuations is determined by the "great genetic lottery" that people are born with, which leads them to conclude that how happy they may feel at the moment or over time is simply due to the luck of the draw, or gene. This fluctuation was also not due to educational attainment, which only accounted for less than 2% of the variance in well-being for women, and less than 1% of the variance for men.

They consider that the individualities measured together with personality tests remain steady throughout an individual's lifespan. They further believe that human beings may refine their forms or personality but can never change them entirely. Darwin's theory of evolution steered evolutionary biologists such as George C. Williams and W. D. Hamilton to the concept of personality evolution. They suggested that physical organs and also personality is a product of natural selection.

With the advent of gene sequencing, it has become possible to search for and identify specific gene polymorphisms that affect traits such as IQ and personality. These techniques work by tracking the association of differences in a trait of interest with differences in specific molecular markers or functional variants.

In contrast to views developed in 1960s that gender identity is primarily learned (which led to a protocol of surgical sex changes in male infants with injured or malformed genitals, such as David Reimer), genomics has provided solid evidence that both sex and gender identities are primarily influenced by genes:

It is now clear that genes are vastly more influential than virtually any other force in shaping sex identity and gender identity ... The growing consensus in medicine is that ... children should be assigned to their chromosomal (i.e., genetic) sex regardless of anatomical variations and differences—with the option of switching, if desired, later in life.

— Siddhartha Mukherjee, The Gene: An Intimate History, 2016

== See also ==
- Behavioral epigenetics – Study of epigenetics' influencing behavior
- Dual inheritance theory – Theory of human behavior
- Interactionism (nature versus nurture) – View that behavior develops from both
- Nature–culture divide – Theoretical foundation of anthropology
- Niche picking – Psychological theory
- Mind–body problem – Open question in philosophy of how abstract minds interact with physical bodies
- Science wars – 1990s dispute in philosophy of science
- Sex differences in humans – Difference between males and females
- Sociobiology – Subdiscipline of biology regarding social behavior
- Structure and agency – Debate in social sciences
- Identical Strangers – 2007 memoir by reunited identical twins
- Three Identical Strangers – 2018 documentary film directed by Tim Wardle

== Sources ==
- Pinker, Steven (2002). The Blank Slate: The Modern Denial of Human Nature. Viking. ISBN 978-0-670-03151-1.
