= J. R. Harris =

J. R. Harris may refer to:

- Judith Rich Harris (1938–2018), psychologist
- J. Rendel Harris (1852–1941), biblical scholar
