= Executive Loneliness =

2020 book

- Author: Nick Jonsson
- Language: English
- Genre: Non-fiction, Self-help
- Published: 2020
- Publisher: Evolve Systems Group Pty Ltd
- Pages: 236
- ISBN: 978-1-64633-588-6
- Website: Official website

Executive Loneliness is a book by Nick Jonsson that explores the psychological challenges faced by executives and top managers. The author addresses the question of why successful leaders, who appear to be well-supported and thriving, often feel isolated and lonely. The book examines the causes of this phenomenon and offers strategies to overcome these feelings.

== Summary ==
The book explores "executive loneliness," a condition caused by the high expectations, pressure, and responsibilities, that come with leadership roles, which often lead to isolation. Jonsson highlights common triggers like fear of showing weakness, maintaining a successful image, and lacking support. He offers strategies to address these issues, such as seeking help, building strong personal and professional relationships, and achieving work-life balance. He recommends that senior executives and entrepreneurs join a confidential peer group while emphasizing the importance of personally belonging to a community where we can be our authentic selves. The book seeks to destigmatize mental health challenges among leaders and promote open discussions on the topic.

== Background ==
Executive Loneliness was published in 2020 by Evolve Systems Group and is based on both research and real-life experiences. Nick Jonsson, an executive and leadership coach, uses his own experiences and insights from other leaders to highlight the mental health challenges often faced by individuals in high-level positions.

== Reception ==
Executive Loneliness received positive reviews for its candid approach to a topic often overlooked in the corporate world. Critics praised the book for its insightful analysis and practical recommendations. It has been particularly well received by executives, entrepreneurs and mental health professionals who recognize the importance of addressing the psychological well-being of leaders.

Since its release, Executive Loneliness created conversations about mental health among leaders, raising awareness about the issue. The book was referenced in various discussions and articles on executive mental health, contributing to further research and initiatives that support leaders in managing their well-being.
