= No Two Alike =

- Author: Judith Rich Harris
- Publisher: W.W. Norton
- Publication date: 2006
- ISBN: 978-0-393-05948-9

No Two Alike: Human Nature and Human Individuality is a book by psychology researcher Judith Rich Harris. It was published in February 2006. Harris attempts to explain why people are so different in personality, even identical twins who grow up in the same home.

No Two Alike expands on some of the ideas from her previous book The Nurture Assumption, especially the effect of birth order on personality and criticism of developmental psychology. She also attempts to answer some of the criticisms leveled at The Nurture Assumption.

Harris proposes that three distinct mental systems shape personality:

- A relationship system that allows us to distinguish family from strangers and tell individuals apart.
- A socialization system that helps us to become members of a group and absorb the group's culture.
- A status system that enables us to acquire self-knowledge by measuring ourselves against others.

The book was translated into Hebrew in 2006.

== Reviews ==
- NY Times
- Evolutionary Psychology (journal)
- Additional reviews.
