= Gene–environment correlation =

Dependence of environmental conditions on individual genotype

Gene–environment correlation (or genotype–environment correlation) is said to occur when exposure to environmental conditions depends on an individual's genotype.

== Definition ==
Gene–environment correlations (or rGE) is correlation of two traits, e.g. height and weight, which would mean that when one changes, so does the other. Gene–environment correlations can arise by both causal and non-causal mechanisms. Of principal interest are those causal mechanisms which indicate genetic control over environmental exposure. Genetic variants influence environmental exposure indirectly via behavior. Three causal mechanisms giving rise to gene–environment correlations have been described.

(i) Passive gene–environment correlation refers to the association between the genotype a child inherits from their parents and the environment in which the child is raised. Parents create a home environment that is influenced by their own heritable characteristics. Biological parents also pass on genetic material to their children. When the children's genotype also influences their behavioral or cognitive outcomes, the result can be a spurious relationship between environment and outcome. For example, because parents who have histories of antisocial behavior (which is moderately heritable) are at elevated risk of abusing their children, a case can be made for saying that maltreatment may be a marker for genetic risk that parents transmit to children rather than a causal risk factor for children’s conduct problems.

(ii) Evocative (or reactive) gene–environment correlation happens when an individual's (heritable) behavior evokes an environmental response. For example, the association between marital conflict and depression may reflect the tensions that arise when engaging with a depressed spouse rather than a causal effect of marital conflict on risk for depression.

(iii) Active gene–environment correlation occurs when an individual possesses a heritable inclination to select environmental exposure. For example, individuals who are characteristically extroverted may seek out very different social environments than those who are shy and withdrawn.

Gene–environment correlation can also arise from non-causal mechanisms, including evolutionary processes and behavioral 'contamination' of the environmental measure. Evolutionary processes, such as genetic drift and natural selection, can cause allele frequencies to differ between populations. For example, exposure to malaria-bearing mosquitoes over many generations may have caused the higher allele frequency among certain ethnic groups for the sickle hemoglobin (HbS) allele, a recessive mutation that causes sickle-cell disease but confers resistance against malaria. In this way, HbS genotype has become associated with the malarial environment.

== Evidence ==
=== Quantitative genetic studies ===
Twin and adoption studies have provided much of the evidence for gene–environment correlations by demonstrating that putative environmental measures are heritable. For example, studies of adult twins have shown that desirable and undesirable life events are moderately heritable as are specific life events and life circumstances, including divorce, the propensity to marry, marital quality and social support. Studies in which researchers have measured child-specific aspects of the environment have also shown that putative environmental factors, such as parental discipline or warmth, are moderately heritable. Television viewing, peer group orientations and social attitudes have all been shown to be moderately heritable. There is also a growing literature on the genetic factors influencing behaviors that constitute a risk to health, such as the consumption of alcohol, tobacco and illegal drugs, and risk-taking behaviors. Like parental discipline, these health related behaviors are genetically influenced, but are thought to have environmentally mediated effects on disease. To the extent that researchers have attempted to determine why genes and environments are correlated, most evidence has pointed to the intervening effects of personality and behavioral characteristics.

Environments are heritable because genotype influences the behaviours that evoke, select, and modify features of the environment. Thus, environments less amenable to behavioural modification tend to be less heritable. For example, negative life events that are beyond the control of the individual (e.g., the death of a loved one, losing one’s home in a natural disaster) have lower heritability than negative life events that may be dependent on an individual’s behaviour (e.g., getting a divorce, getting fired from a job). Similarly, personal life events (i.e., events that occur directly to an individual) are more highly heritable than network life events (i.e., events that occur to someone within an individual’s social network, thus affecting the individual indirectly).

=== Molecular genetic studies ===
Evidence for the existence of gene–environment correlations has recently started to accrue from molecular genetic investigations. The Collaborative Studies on Genetics of Alcoholism (COGA) group has reported that a single-nucleotide polymorphism in intron 7 of the gamma-aminobutyric acid A a2 receptor (rs279871; GABRA2) was associated with alcohol dependence and marital status. Individuals who had the high-risk GABRA2 variant (i.e., the variant associated with alcohol dependence) were less likely to be married, in part because they were at higher risk for antisocial personality disorder and were less likely to be motivated by a desire to please others. There is also molecular evidence for passive gene–environment correlation. A recent study found that children were almost 2.5 times more likely to be diagnosed with attention-deficit hyperactivity disorder (ADHD) if their mothers were divorced, separated, or never married. In this sample, however, mothers possessing the short allele of the dopamine receptor gene DRD2 were more likely to be divorced, separated, or never married. Moreover, their children were more likely to have ADHD. Therefore, part of the association between parental marital status and ADHD diagnosis among children in this sample is due to the confounding variable of maternal DRD2 genotype. Both of these studies also found evidence for gene–environment interaction.

A polygenic score (PGS; also called a polygenic risk score), which is a number assigned to individuals based on variation in multiple genetic loci and their associated regression weights from genome-wide association studies, can also be used to demonstrate gene–environment correlation. This effect, often referred to as "genetic nurture", is suggestive of passive gene–environment correlation when parental polygenic score independently predicts offspring outcome beyond the offspring's own PGS, and has been demonstrated for educational attainment in humans. Higher PGS for mental disorders such as major depressive disorder, schizophrenia, and ADHD have also been found to be associated with higher reported exposures to stressful life events such in adults with depression.

== Significance ==
Doctors want to know whether exposure to environmental risk causes disease. The fact that environmental exposures are heritable means that the relationship between environmental exposure and disease may be confounded by genotype. That is, the relationship may be spurious (not causal), because the same genetic factors might be influencing both exposure to environmental risk and disease. In such cases, measures aimed at reducing environmental exposure will not reduce the risk for disease. On the other hand, heritability of exposure to environmental conditions itself does not mean environmental factors are not responsible for disease and so exposure reduction would benefit individuals with genetic predisposition to risk behavior.

For example, a study of children born to twin sisters investigated whether the relationship between parental divorce and offspring alcohol and emotional problems was causal or confounded by parental genotype. The study found that the offspring of twin sisters who were discordant for divorce had equally high levels of emotional problems, suggesting that genetic factors which made twin siblings divorce-prone also increased their children’s risk for depression and anxiety. This finding suggests that preventing the parents’ divorce would have had little impact on offspring risk for emotional problems (although the findings for alcohol problems in the children were consistent with a causal role for divorce).

== See also ==
- Behavioral genetics
- Gene–environment interaction
- Genetic predisposition
- Nature versus nurture
- Niche picking
- Psychiatric genetics
- Epigenetics
