= Maudsley Bipolar Twin Study =

Ongoing twin study of bipolar disorder

The Maudsley Bipolar Twin Study is an ongoing twin study of bipolar disorder running at the Institute of Psychiatry, King's College London since 2003. The study is investigating possible differences between people with a diagnosis of bipolar disorder and people without the diagnosis. In particular it is investigating difference in cognition and brain structure/function.

The Maudsley Study of bipolar disorder investigates different aspects of thinking, such as memory and attention, in twins with and without bipolar disorder. The tasks participants complete involve defining words and solving different kinds of problems. With adequate numbers of twins participating in the study, the hope is to understand any differences between these two groups. The eventual aim is to increase understanding of this complex mood disorder and to enhance future therapies for it.
