= The Nurture Assumption =

1998 book by Judith Rich Harris

The Nurture Assumption: Why Children Turn Out the Way They Do
- Cover
- Author: Judith Rich Harris
- Language: English
- Subject: Personality development
- Publisher: The Free Press
- Publication date: 1998
- Publication place: United States
- Media type: Print (Hardcover and Paperback)
- ISBN: 0-684-84409-5

The Nurture Assumption: Why Children Turn Out the Way They Do is a 1998 book by the psychologist Judith Rich Harris. Originally published 1998 by the Free Press, which published a revised edition in 2009. The book was a finalist for the 1999 Pulitzer Prize for General Nonfiction.

The use of "nurture" as a synonym for "environment" is based on the assumption that what influences children's development, apart from their genes, is the way their parents bring them up. I call this the nurture assumption. Only after rearing two children of my own and coauthoring three editions of a college textbook on child development did I begin to question this assumption. Only recently did I come to the conclusion that it is wrong.

— Chapter 1, p. 2.

== Summary ==
Harris challenges the idea that the personality of adults is determined chiefly by the way they were raised by their parents. She looks at studies which claim to show the influence of the parental environment and claims that most fail to control for genetic influences. For example, if aggressive parents are more likely to have aggressive children, this is not necessarily evidence of parental example. It may also be that aggressiveness has been passed down through the genes. Indeed, many adopted children show little correlation with the personality of their adoptive parents, and significant correlation with the natural parents who had no part in their upbringing.

The role of genetics in personality has long been accepted in psychological research. However, even identical twins, who share the same genes, are not exactly alike, so inheritance is not the only determinant of personality. Psychologists have tended to assume that the non-genetic factor is the parental environment, the "nurture". However, Harris argues that it is a mistake to use "'nurture' ... [as] a synonym for 'environment.'" Many twin studies have failed to find a strong connection between the home environment and personality. Identical twins differ to much the same extent whether they are raised together or apart. Adoptive siblings are as unalike in personality as non-related children. Developmental noise may be involved instead of possible systematic imports e.g. from parenting styles.

More specifically, Harris also argues against the effects of birth order. She states:

Birth order effects are like those things that you think you see out of the corner of your eye but that disappear when you look at them closely. They do keep turning up but only because people keep looking for them and keep analyzing and reanalyzing their data until they find them.

Harris' most innovative idea was to look outside the family and to point at the peer group as an important shaper of the child's psyche. For example, children of immigrants learn the language of their home country with ease and speak with the accent of their peers rather than their parents. Children identify with their classmates and playmates rather than their parents, modify their behavior to fit with the peer group, and this ultimately helps to form the character of the individual. Harris called her idea "group socialization theory," which she summarized as the assertion that "children get their ideas of how to behave by identifying with a group and taking on its attitudes, behaviors, speech, and styles of dress and adornment."

== Reception ==
The Nurture Assumption received mostly positive responses. The neuroscientist Robert Sapolsky says her book is "based on solid science". The psychologist Steven Pinker of Harvard predicts that the book "will come to be seen as a turning point in the history of psychology".

Wendy Williams, who studies how environment affects IQ, argues that "there are many, many good studies that show parents can affect how children turn out in both cognitive abilities and behavior". The psychologist Jerome Kagan argues that Harris "ignores some important facts, ones that are inconsistent with this book's conclusions".

Harris herself, however, went on to most vividly reject the notion in particular that The Nurture Assumption will encourage parents to neglect or mistreat their children. She maintains that parents will continue to treat their children well "for the same reason you are nice to your friends and your partner, even though you have no hopes of molding their character. For the same reason your great-grandparents were nice to their children, even though they didn't believe in the nurture assumption".

== See also ==
- Behavioral genetics
- Selfish Reasons To Have More Kids
- Nature versus nurture

== Reviews ==
- "Do Parents Matter?", Malcolm Gladwell, The New Yorker, August 17, 1998.
- Psychpage review, Richard Niolon.
- "Peer Pressure", Carol Tavris, New York Times, September 13, 1998.
- "Additional book reviews". Judithrichharris.info.
