= Peer group =

Primary group of people with similar interests, age, background, or social status

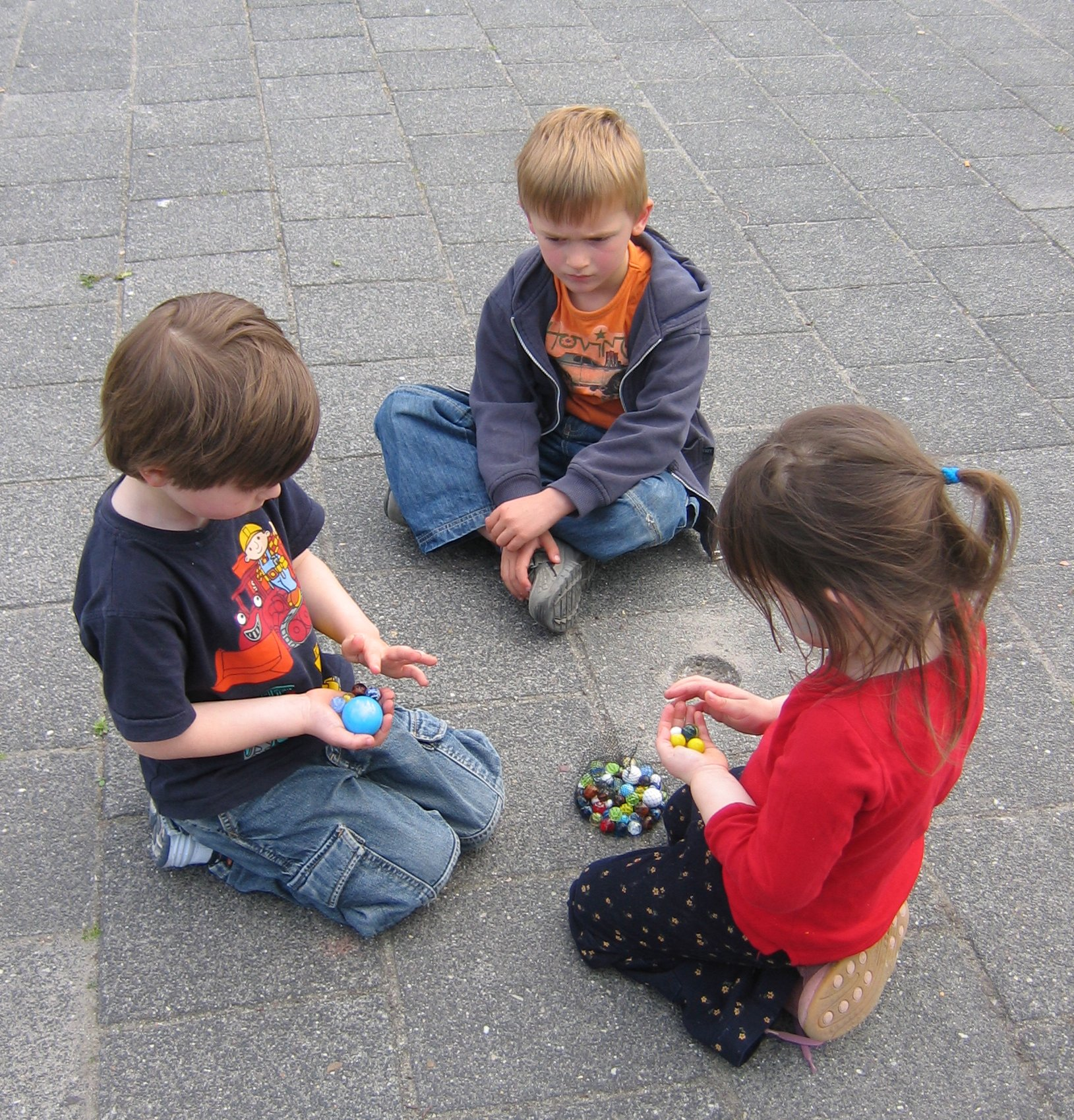
Early childhood peers engaged in parallel play

In sociology, a peer group is both a social group and a primary group of people who have similar interests (homophily), age, background, or social status. Members of peer groups are likely to influence each other's beliefs and behaviour.

During adolescence, peer groups tend to face dramatic changes. Adolescents tend to spend more time with their peers and have less adult supervision. Peer groups give a sense of security and identity. A study found that during the adolescent phase as adolescents spend double time with their peers compared to the time youth spend with their parents. Adolescents' communication shifts during this time as well. They prefer to talk about school and their careers with their parents, and they enjoy talking about sex and other interpersonal relationships with their peers. Children try to join peer groups who accept them, even if the group is involved in negative activities. Children are less likely to accept those who are different from them. Friendship and support is important for people to have an active social life. Similarly, it is equally important to people with disability as it can help them to feel included, valued and happier. Social interaction among peers may influence development; quality of life outcomes. This interaction and positive relationship benefit subjective wellbeing and have a positive effect on mental and physical health.

Cliques are small groups typically defined by common interests or by friendship. Cliques typically have 2–12 members and tend to be formed by age, gender, race, and social class. Clique members are usually the same in terms of academics and risk behaviors. Cliques can serve as an agent of socialization and social control. Being part of a clique can be advantageous since it may provide a sense of autonomy, a secure social environment, and overall well-being.

Crowds are larger, more vaguely defined groups that may not have a friendship base. Crowds serve as peer groups, and they increase in importance during early adolescence, and decrease by late adolescence. The level of involvement in adult institutions and peer culture describes crowds.

== Socialization ==
At an early age, the peer group becomes an important part of socialization Unlike other agents of socialization, such as family and school, peer groups allow children to escape the direct supervision of adults. Among peers, children learn to form relationships on their own, and have the chance to discuss interests that adults may not share with children, such as clothing and popular music, or may not permit, such as drugs and sex. Peer groups can have great influence or peer pressure on each other's behavior, depending on the amount of pressure. However, currently more than 23 percent of children globally lack enough connections with their age group, and their cognitive, emotional and social development are delayed than other kids.

== Developmental psychology ==
Developmental psychologists, Lev Vygotsky, Jean Piaget, Erik Erikson, Harry Stack Sullivan, and social learning theorists have all argued that peer relationships provide a unique context for cognitive, social, and emotional development. Modern research echoes these sentiments, showing that social and emotional gains are indeed provided by peer interaction.

Vygotsky's Sociocultural Theory focuses on the importance of a child's culture and notes that a child is continually acting in social interactions with others. He also focuses on language development and identifies the zone of proximal development. The Zone of Proximal development is defined as the gap between what a student can do alone and what the student can achieve through teacher assistance. The values and attitudes of the peer group are essential elements in learning. Those who surround themselves with academically focused peers will be more likely to internalize this type of behavior.

Piaget's theory of cognitive development identifies four stages of cognitive development. He believes that children actively construct their understanding of the world based on their own experiences. In addition Piaget identified with aspects of development, occurring from middle childhood onwards, for which peer groups are essential. He suggested that children's speech to peers is less egocentric than their speech to adults. Egocentric speech is referring to the speech that is not adapted to what the listener just said.

Erikson's stages of psychosocial development include eight stages ranging from birth to old age. He has emphasized the idea that the society, not just the family, influences one's ego and identity through developmental stages. Erikson went on to describe how peer pressure is a key event during the adolescences stage of psychosocial development. In his Latency stage, which includes children from 6–12 years old and this is when the adolescents begin to develop relationships among their peers.

Harry Stack Sullivan has developed the Theory of Interpersonal Relations. Sullivan described friendships as providing the following functions: (a) offering consensual validation, (b) bolstering feelings of self-worth, (c) providing affection and a context for intimate disclosure, (d) promoting interpersonal sensitivity, and (e) setting the foundation for romantic and parental relationships. Sullivan believed these functions developed during childhood and that true friendships were formed around the age of 9 or 10.

Social learning theorists such as John B. Watson, B.F. Skinner, and Albert Bandura, all argue for the influences of the social group in learning and development. Behaviourism, Operant Learning Theory, and Cognitive Social Learning Theory all consider the role the social world plays on development.

In The Nurture Assumption and No Two Alike, psychologist Judith Rich Harris suggests that an individual's peer group significantly influences their intellectual and personal development. Several longitudinal studies support the conjecture that peer groups significantly affect scholastic achievement, particularly when adult involvement is low. Relatively few studies have examined the effect peer groups have on tests of cognitive ability. However, there is some evidence that peer groups influence tests of cognitive ability.

== Positive attributes (advantages) ==
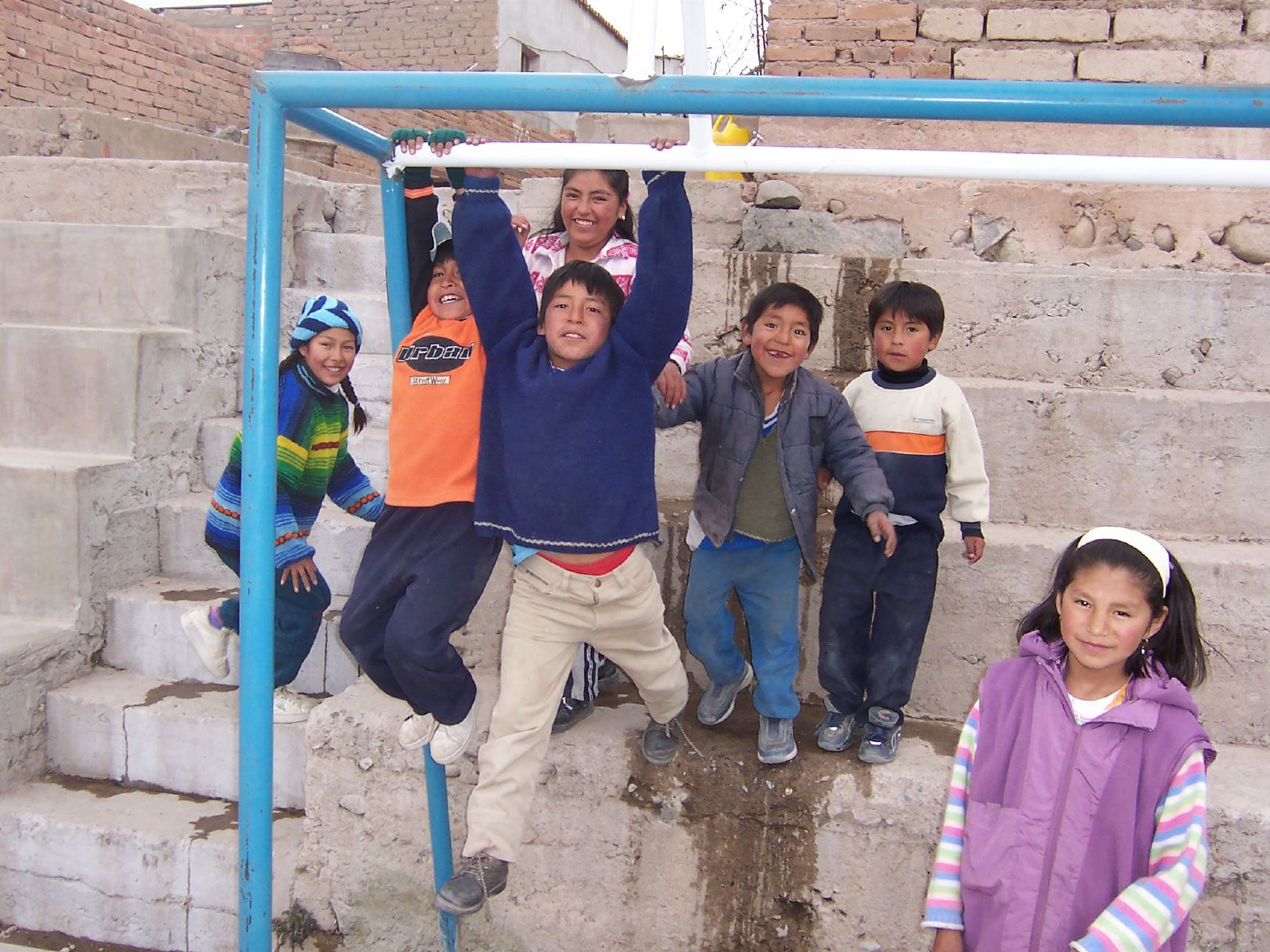
A group of children playing together in Bolivia

=== Serve as a source of information ===
Peer groups provide perspective outside of the individual's viewpoints. Members inside peer groups also learn to develop relationships with others in the social system. Peers, particularly group members, become important social referents for teaching other members customs, social norms, and different ideologies. Positive peer relationships improve social interaction and enhance positive engagement levels in adolescents with and without disabilities. Peers foster overall well-being by offering practical, emotional, and social support.

=== Teach gender roles ===
Peer groups can also serve as a venue for teaching members gender roles. Through gender-role socialization, group members learn about sex differences, and social and cultural expectations. While boys and girls differ greatly, there is not a one-to-one link between sex and gender roles with males always being masculine and females always being feminine. Both genders can contain different levels of masculinity and femininity. Peer groups can consist of all males, all females, or both males and females. Studies show that the majority of peer groups are unisex.

=== Serve as a practicing venue to adulthood ===
Adolescent peer groups provide support as teens assimilate into adulthood. Major changes include: decreasing dependence on parents, increasing feelings of self-sufficiency, and connecting with a much larger social network. Adolescents are expanding their perspective beyond the family and learning how to negotiate relationships with others in different parts of the social system. Peers, particularly group members, become important social referents. Peer groups also influence individual members' attitudes and behaviours on many cultural and social issues, such as: drug use, violence, and academic achievement. and even the development and expression of prejudice.

=== Teach unity and collective behaviour in life ===
Peer groups provide an influential social setting in which group norms are developed and enforced through socialization processes that promote in-group similarity. Peer groups' cohesion is determined and maintained by such factors as group communication, group consensus, and group conformity concerning attitude and behavior. As members of peer groups interconnect and agree on what defines them as a group, a normative code arises. This normative code can become very rigid, such as when deciding on group behavior and clothing attire. Member deviation from the strict normative code can lead to rejection from the group.

=== Identity formation ===
Peer groups (friends group) can help individuals form their own identity. Identity formation is a developmental process where a person acquires a sense of self. One of the major factors that influence the formation of a person's identity is his or her peers. Studies have shown that peers provide normative regulation, and that they provide a staging ground for the practice of social behaviors. This allows individuals to experiment with roles and discover their identities. The identity formation process is an important role in an individual's development. Erik Erikson emphasized the importance of identity formation, and he illustrated the steps one takes in developing his or her sense of self. He believed this process occurs throughout one's entire life. Peer interactions have a significant impact on adolescents, developing empathy, conflict resolution, and interpersonal skills, these relationships also play a crucial role in shaping body image and satisfaction.

== Negative attributes (disadvantages) ==
=== Peer pressure ===
The term peer pressure is often used to describe instances where an individual feels indirectly pressured into changing their behavior to match that of their peers. Taking up smoking and underage drinking are two of the best known examples. In spite of the often negative connotations of the term, peer pressure can be used positively, for example, to encourage other peers to study, or not to engage in activities such as the ones discussed above. Although peer pressure is not isolated to one age group, it is usually most common during the adolescent stage. Adolescence is a period characterized by experimentation, and adolescents typically spend a lot of time with their peers in social contexts. Teenagers compel each other to go along with certain beliefs or behaviors, and studies have shown that boys are more likely to give in to it than girls. There has been much research done to gain a better understanding about the effects of peer pressure, and this research will allow parents to handle and understand their children's behaviors and obstacles they will face due to their peer groups. Learning how peer pressure impacts individuals is a step to minimizing the negative effects it leads to.

=== Future problems ===
Success of peer relationships is linked to later psychological development and to academic achievement. Therefore, if one does not have successful peer relationships it may lead to developmental delays and poor academic achievement—perhaps even in-completion of a high school degree. Children with poor peer relationships may also experience job related and marital problems later in life.

=== Risk behaviors ===
Several studies have shown that peer groups are powerful agents of risk behaviors in adolescence. Adolescents typically replace family with peers regarding social and leisure activities, and many problematic behaviors occur in the context of these groups. A study done in 2012 focused on adolescents' engagement in risk behaviors. Participants completed a self-report measure of identity commitment, which explores values, beliefs, and aspirations, as well as a self-report that measures perceived peer group pressure and control. Both peer group pressure and control were positively related to risky behaviors. However, adolescents who were more committed to a personal identity had lower rates of risk behaviors. Overall, this study shows us that adolescent identity development may help prevent negative effects of peer pressure in high-risk adolescents.

=== Aggression and prosocial behavior ===
Social behaviors can be promoted or discouraged by social groups, and several studies have shown that aggression and prosociality are susceptible to peer influence. A longitudinal study done in 2011 focused on these two behaviors. A sample of adolescents was followed over a one-year period, and results showed that adolescents who joined an aggressive group were more likely to increase their aggression levels. Also, adolescents were likely to display prosocial behaviors that were similar to the consistent behaviors of the group they were in. An adolescent's peer group plays a role in shaping him or her into an adult, and the lack of positive behavior can lead to consequences in the future.

=== Sexual promiscuity ===
Adolescence is also characterized by physical changes, new emotions, and sexual urges, and teenagers are likely to participate in sexual activity. A longitudinal study done in 2012 followed a group of adolescents for thirteen years. Self-reports, peer nominations, teacher ratings, counselor ratings, and parent reports were collected, and results showed a strong correlation between deviant peer groups and sexual promiscuity. Many teens claimed that the reasons for having sex at a young age include peer pressure or pressure from their partner. The effects of sexual activity at a young age are of great concern. Pregnancy and sexually transmitted diseases are only a few of the consequences that can occur.

=== Exclusion ===
In peer-dominated contexts, functional diversity may lead to marginalization and exclusion. Socially excluded children may have unsatisfying peer relationships, low self-esteem, and lack of achievement motivation, which affect their social and academic aspects of life, mental health, and general well-being. Individuals with disabilities encounter challenges in peer relationships, including deficits in social skills such as emotion detection, conflict resolution, and conceptual understanding.

== Adolescents and their peer groups ==
=== Gavin's study ===
In one cross-sectional, correlational study, four different developmental stages were examined: preadolescence (Grades 5 and 6), early adolescence (Grades 7 and 8), middle adolescence (Grades 9 and 10) and late adolescence (Grades 11 and 12). Self-report measures were used in which adolescents completed questionnaires. First, the students rated the importance of being in a popular group. Next, positive and negative behaviour were assessed. The extent to which students were bothered by negative behaviour targeted at them by others in their groups was also assessed. Structural group properties were also examined, including: group leadership or status hierarchy, group permeability, and group conformity.

Researchers found that middle adolescents reported placing more importance on being in a popular group and perceived more group conformity and leadership within their groups than pre- and late adolescents. Early and middle adolescents also reported more negative interactions and fewer positive interactions with group members and more negative interactions with those not part of their peer groups. Girls reported having more positive group interactions, being more bothered by negative interactions, and having more permeable group boundaries. Boys reported more negative interactions with those outside their groups and are more likely to have leaders in their peer groups. Researchers believe that the decrease in conformity throughout adolescence relates to the decrease in importance of leadership in late adolescence because having a group leader provides a person to model oneself after. They also note the relationship between the importance of being in a popular peer group and conformity. Both become less important in late adolescence, showing that it is less important to conform when the value of group membership decreases. It is believed that positive interactions outside of peer groups increase and negative interactions outside of peer groups decrease by late adolescence because older adolescents feel more comfortable and have less need to control the behaviours of others. Findings that boys have more leaders are consistent with research showing that boys partake in more dominance struggles.

=== Tarrant's study ===
A questionnaire was handed out to 58 males and 57 females, aged 14–15 in the Midlands region of the UK. The first section dealt with group structure and activities of participants' peer groups. Participants were asked how many people were in their group, the gender composition of the group, frequency of group meetings, and the group's usual meeting places. The second section addressed the participants' levels of identification with their peer groups. The next section of the questionnaire was an intergroup comparison task in which participants compared their peer group to an outgroup. The comparison referred to how sixteen different adjectives "fit" or "described" both their ingroup and outgroup. The final part of the questionnaire was designed to check the manipulation of the adjective valence. In this section, participants rated the desirability of the above sixteen adjectives in their own opinions.

Findings supported social identity theory as participants consistently favoured the ingroup in two ways: the ingroup was always associated with a greater number of positive characteristics compared to the outgroup, and the more a participant identified with the ingroup, the higher their evaluations were for it.

=== Same race peer groups ===
Consistent with the dictionary definition of peer groups, youth tend to form groups based on similarities. It has been found that one of these similarities is by race. Preference for same race grows stronger as youth develop. When Latino and Caucasian youth were given surveys asking them to indicate who in their school they had the highest preference to spend time with, they both nominated peers of their same race over peers of different races. This is especially prevalent in classrooms and schools that have a clear cut majority and minority racial groups. Though benefits of homophily are met, preference for one's own racial group can lead to rejection of the racial out group, which can cause stress for both groups particularly in females.

=== Cross race peer groups ===
For classrooms and schools that have a more equal distribution of racial groups, there can be more socialization across peer groups. Cross racial peers groups can be very beneficial, lowering prejudice and increasing prosocial behaviors. Having a cross racial friend has also been shown to give youth a higher status and feel more socially satisfied. Diverse peer groups also lower the feelings of victimization felt by youth.

=== Disability and peer group ===
An effective approach to promoting peer relationships among adolescents with disabilities may require a comprehensive strategy that addresses the individual and social aspects of support, fostering understanding. This might involve imparting information and resources on disabilities to both peers and schools, organizing meaningful social activities with friends, and providing emotional support.

== See also ==
- Group dynamics – System of behaviors within or between social groups
- Social relation – Any interpersonal relationship between two or more conspecifics between/within groups
