= The Mind of Primitive Man =

Written work by Franz Boas

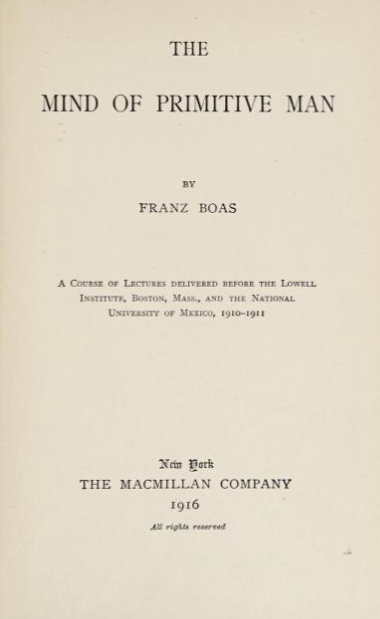
- Title page for The Mind of Primitive Man (1916)
- Author: Franz Boas
- Language: English
- Subject: Anthropology
- Genre: Non-fiction
- Publisher: Macmillan
- Publication date: 1911

The Mind of Primitive Man is a 1911 book by anthropologist Franz Boas which takes a critical look at the concept of primitive culture. The work challenged widely held racist and eugenic claims about race and intelligence, particularly white supremacy.

In 1895, Boas made the first speech that would form this book, as vice-president of the Section of Anthropology of the American Association for the Advancement of Science. He later made a speech by this title at the 1900 American Folk Lore Society conference held at Johns Hopkins University.

The material was further expanded as a course of lectures delivered before the Lowell Institute in Boston and the National University of Mexico in 1910 and 1911. Following the 1911 publication, the book was revised several times. It is considered an important work in cultural anthropology and the methodological concept of cultural relativism.

== Overview ==
Boas examines beliefs that more accomplished civilizations must have higher intelligence and "discovered little evidence to support them." He then examines the debate on nature versus nurture and finds that the heritability of IQ and the ratio of intellectual giftedness of people within a civilization were "at best a possible, but not a necessary, element determining the degree of advancement of a race." He states that "a direct relation between physical habitus and mental endowment does not exist," giving examples of different human sizes and shapes that do not correlate with intelligence. He also discusses the role of environment and intelligence, especially nutrition, as well as the degree of racial admixture and "domestication" within societies and its effects on the "mentality of man."

Boas argues that all humans have the same basic characteristics. He writes that phenotypes developed within isolation of a genetic group, and that "similar tendencies may exist in the mental life of a man." He argues that intermarriage can spread these physical and mental traits within and among civilizations.

Boas notes that the gulf in ability between different "primitive" and "civilized" humans is negligible compared to the gulf between humans and animals. He debunks claims that "primitive" humans have no impulse control, no attention span, no originality of thought, no power of reasoning, and are not capable of sustainability. He compares human types, human language, and human cultures and finds no one language superior to others. He concludes that "languages were moulded by thought, not thought by languages." He also examines theories of cultural development which assume every culture must pass through specific levels or stages and states "not all stages have been present in all types of cultures." He concludes that race does not correlate with cultural development, which is "essentially a phenomenon dependent on historical causes, regardless of race."

Boas spends the next section examining epistemology, especially the production of knowledge. Rather than being affected by race, Boas asserts that "differences in logical conclusions reached by primitive and civilized man [are] owing to the difference in the character of knowledge accumulated by preceding generations." Boas says the primary difference between primitive and civilized society is a shift from irrationality to rationality caused by "an improvement of the traditional material that enters into our habitual mental operations."

Boas concludes the book with an examination of racism in the United States. He expresses his hope that anthropology can lead to more tolerance and sympathy for different civilizations, since "all races have contributed in the past to cultural progress in one way or another."
