= Niche picking =

Psychological theory

Niche picking is a psychological theory that people choose environments that complement their heredity. For example, extroverts may deliberately engage with others like themselves. Niche picking is a component of gene-environment correlation.

== Scarr and McCartney's model ==
In 1983, psychology professors Sandra Scarr and Kathleen McCartney proposed that genes affect the environments individuals choose to interact with, and that phenotypes influence individuals’ exchanges with people, places, and situations. The model states that genotypes can determine an individual's response to a certain environment, and that these genotype-environment pairs can affect human development. Scarr and McCartney, influenced by Robert Plomin's findings, recognized three types of gene-environment correlations. As humans develop, they enter each of these stages in succession, and each is more influential than the last.

Passive
During infancy, individuals' environments are provided by their parents. The rearing environment reflects the parents' genes, so it is genetically suitable for the child.

Evocative
Environments respond to individuals based on the genes they express (phenotype). Infants and adolescents evoke social and physical responses from their environments through this interaction. Experiences, and therefore development, are more influenced by evocation than by the passive environment. However, the influence of evocation declines over time.

Active
Individuals selectively attend to aspects of their environment that correlate to their specific genotypes and autonomously choose environments to interact with. Their selections are based on motivational, personality, and intellectual aspects of their genotype. Therefore, environmental interactions are person specific and can vary greatly. Since these environments are chosen rather than encountered, they have a greater effect on experience and development.

=== Role ===
Scarr and McCartney defined niche picking as a mechanism used to select environments suitable for one's genotype. Therefore, an individual’s temperament often affects the type of niche selected, since environment reflects one’s general disposition.

An individual's niche can change over time, as explained in Emilie Snell-Rood's theory of behavioral plasticity and evolution. Snell-Rood argues that one element of developmental behavioral plasticity is the change in a gene’s expressed phenotype as a result of a change in environment. Expressed behaviors reflect the environment one welcomes, and these behaviors change as a result of that environment. If an individual has encountered an environment before, their behavioral change can be attributed to learning, allowing the production of different responses. With respect to niche picking, this suggests that individuals' process of selecting environments evolves, as does their method of response and level of responsiveness.

== Examples ==
The genotype-environment model states that as siblings and fraternal twins age, their phenotypes grow apart. This is due to their respective mastery of the passive, evocative, and active interactions. When the siblings are infants, the environments their parents provide are similar. But as they age and begin to evoke responses from their environments, the social and physical elements they encounter start to vary.

The personal characteristics that encourage environmental responses, such as appearance, personality, and intellect, are not the same between siblings and fraternal twins because of gene variations. Once siblings can actively interact with their environment and select environments they like, differences between their niches become clear. This process is evident in families where one child is outgoing and lively while the other is timid and cautious.

According to Frank Sulloway, a social researcher, most characteristic differences between siblings result from personality variation and non-shared environments, both of which are influenced by:

- parental investment
- the tendency for siblings to differentiate themselves from each other, often by assuming opposite dispositions
- birth order, personality, and gender roles.

Together, these elements give siblings different evocative and active environmental experiences that reflect their individual niches.

In identical twins, this process is different. When siblings are the same age and have the same appearance, some people respond to them identically, despite their different personalities. Twins encounter the same social and physical influences from their environments, whether they have been reared separately or together. Often, this causes them to develop similar niches, though it does not guarantee that they will.

== Contemporary applications ==
Scarr and McCartney's model provides a framework for examining the role that children's genotypes play in determining environmental interactions. Two major topics associated with this research are public policies to promote children's education and the heritability of political beliefs.

=== Implications for policy makers ===
In a 1996 study, Scarr examined the implications of genotype-environment interaction for public policy, specifically in education. She advised policy makers to be cautious when using programs such as Head Start to encourage intellectual development in children, arguing that genotype-environment interactions gave all children (except those raised in particularly abusive or neglectful homes) "good-enough opportunities" to develop without the aid of such programs.

Policy makers might expect to see a jump in children's intellectual abilities from programs such as Head Start, which are designed to introduce children to a school setting, create a stable environment, and further their cognitive talents. Scarr, however, suggests that they cannot fully recreate what intelligent parents and a nurturing environment provide. She instead advocates a varied and stimulating environment that lets children use various types of niche expression.

Scarr conducted an experiment in 1997 on the impact of out-of-home day care on children. From this and previous studies, she concluded that the quality of day care had only small, temporary effects on intellectual development. She noted that for children from good homes, genotype-environment interaction usually provides most of the intellectual development they need. Parental and environmental support allows these children to explore the niches most suited to their intellectual desires and abilities.

These findings suggest that children from low-income families can benefit from programs that offer the same kind of support. Rather than a narrow environment that focuses on assimilating children into educational institutions, a stimulating environment would provide the most benefit to children who do not get adequate levels of genotype-environment interaction at home.
