= Twin study =

Type of human genetic study conducted on twins

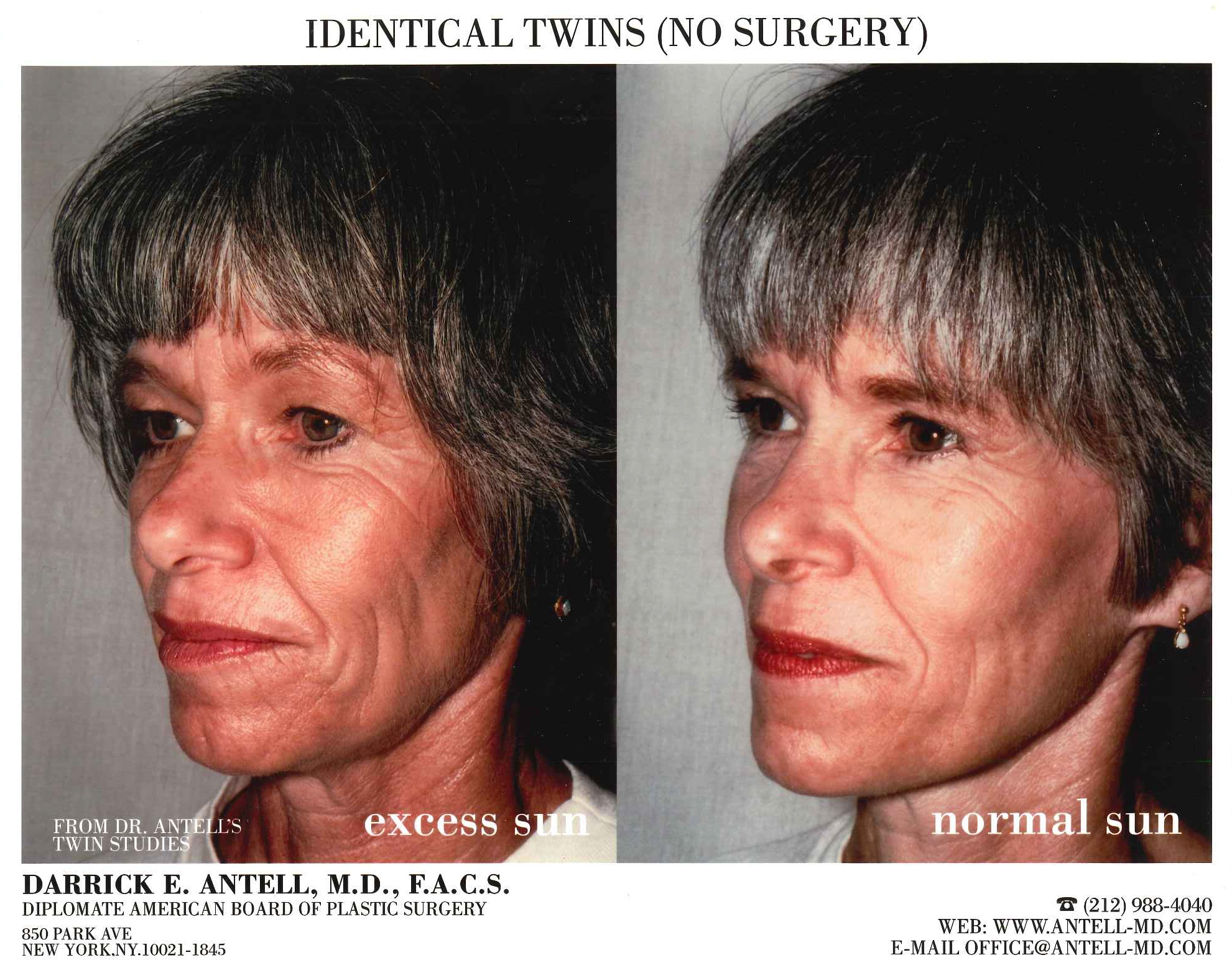
A pair of identical twins, one of whom has had more sun exposure than the other

Twin studies are studies conducted on identical or fraternal twins. They aim to reveal the importance of environmental and genetic influences for traits, phenotypes, and disorders. Twin research is considered a key tool in behavioral genetics and in related fields, from biology to psychology. Twin studies are part of the broader methodology used in behavior genetics, which uses all data that are genetically informative – siblings studies, adoption studies, pedigree, etc. These studies have been used to track traits ranging from personal behavior to the presentation of severe mental illnesses such as schizophrenia.

Twins are a valuable source for observation because they allow the study of environmental influence and varying genetic makeup: "identical" or monozygotic (MZ) twins share essentially 100% of their genes, which means that most differences between the twins (such as height, susceptibility to boredom, intelligence, depression, etc.) are due to experiences that one twin has but not the other twin. "Fraternal" or dizygotic (DZ) twins share only about 50% of their genes, the same as any other sibling. Twins also share many aspects of their environment (e.g., uterine environment, parenting style, education, wealth, culture, community) because they are born into the same family. The presence of a given genetic or phenotypic trait in only one member of a pair of identical twins (called discordance) provides a powerful window into environmental effects on such a trait.

Twins are also useful in showing the importance of the unique environment (specific to one twin or the other) when studying trait presentation. Changes in the unique environment can stem from an event or occurrence that has only affected one twin. This could range from a head injury or a birth defect that one twin has sustained while the other remains healthy.

The classical twin design compares the similarity of monozygotic (identical) and dizygotic (fraternal) twins. If identical twins are considerably more similar than fraternal twins (which is found for all traits), this implies that genes play an important role in these traits. By comparing many hundreds of families with twins, researchers can then understand more about the roles of genetic effects, shared environment, and unique environment in shaping behavior.

Modern twin studies have concluded that all studied traits are partly influenced by genetic differences, with some characteristics showing a stronger influence (e.g. height), others an intermediate level (e.g. personality traits) and some more complex heritabilities, with evidence for different genes affecting different aspects of the trait – as in the case of autism.

== History ==
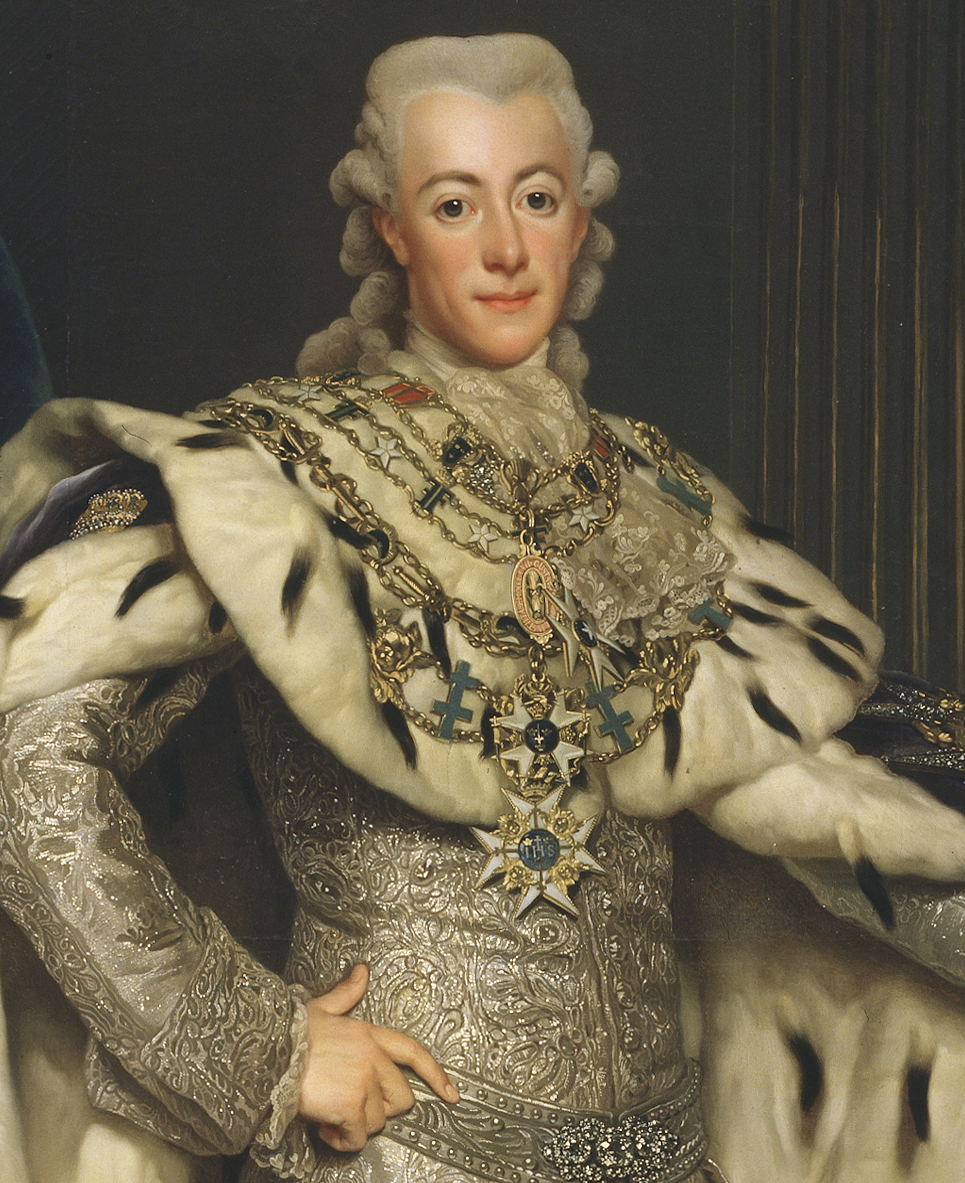
Gustav III of Sweden was the first to use identical twins in a comparative study of medical outcomes.

Twins have been of interest to scholars since early civilization, including the early physician Hippocrates (5th century BCE), who attributed different diseases in twins to different material circumstances, and the stoic philosopher Posidonius (1st century BCE), who attributed such similarities to shared astrological circumstances. Saint Augustine in his Confessions (4th century CE) on the other hand uses the diverging lives lived by twins as an argument against astrology.

Gustav III, King of Sweden was the first to commission a medical study using identical twins. Gustav's father, Adolph Frederick had been an opponent of stimulating drinks such as tea and coffee, signing the Misuse and Excesses Tea and Coffee Drinking Edict in 1757. Both Gustav III and his father had read and been strongly influenced by a 1715 treatise from a French physician on the dangers of what would later be identified as caffeine in tea and coffee. After assuming the throne in 1771 the king became strongly motivated to demonstrate to his subjects that coffee and tea had deleterious effects on human health. To this end he offered to commute the death sentences of a pair of twin murderers if they participated in a primitive clinical trial. Both condemned men agreed and subsequently spent the rest of their lives in prison fulfilling the king's demands: that one twin drink three pots of coffee every day and the other three pots of tea. The tea drinking twin died first at the age of 83, long after Gustav III, who was assassinated in 1792. The age of the coffee-drinking twin at his death is unknown, as both doctors assigned by the king to monitor this study predeceased him. The ban on coffee and tea in Sweden was lifted in 1823.

A more recent study is from Sir Francis Galton's pioneering use of twins to study the role of genes and environment on human development and behavior. Galton, however, was unaware of the difference between identical and DZ twins. This factor was still not understood when the first study using psychological tests was conducted by Edward Thorndike (1905) using fifty pairs of twins. This paper was an early statement of the hypothesis that family effects decline with age. His study compared twin pairs age 9–10 and 13–14 to normal siblings born within a few years of one another.

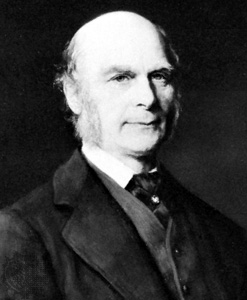
Francis Galton laid the foundations of behavior genetics as a branch of science.

Thorndike incorrectly reasoned that his data supported for there being one, not two, twin types. This mistake was repeated by Ronald Fisher (1919), who argued

The preponderance of twins of like sex, does indeed become a new problem, because it has been formerly believed to be due to the proportion of identical twins. So far as I am aware, however, no attempt has been made to show that twins are sufficiently alike to be regarded as identical really exist in sufficient numbers to explain the proportion of twins of like sex.

An early, and perhaps first, study understanding the distinction is from the German geneticist Hermann Werner Siemens in 1924. Chief among Siemens' innovations was the polysymptomatic similarity diagnosis. This allowed him to account for the oversight that had stumped Fisher, and was a staple in twin research prior to the advent of molecular markers.

Wilhelm Weinberg and colleagues in 1910 used the identical-DZ distinction to calculate respective rates from the ratios of same- and opposite-sex twins in a maternity population. They partitioned co-variation amongst relatives into genetic and environmental elements, anticipating the later work of Fisher and Wright, including the effect of dominance on similarity of relatives, and beginning the first classic-twin studies.

A study conducted by Darrick Antell and Eva Taczanowski found that "twins showing the greatest discrepancies in visible aging signs also had the greatest degree of discordance between personal lifestyle choices and habits", and concluded that "the genetic influences on aging may be highly overrated, with lifestyle choices exerting far more important effects on physical aging."

== Examples ==
Examples of prominent twin studies include the following:

- Maudsley Bipolar Twin Study
- Minnesota Twin Family Study
- Twins Early Development Study
- NASA Twins Study

== Methods ==
The power of twin designs arises from the fact that twins may be either identical (monozygotic (MZ), i.e. developing from a single fertilized egg and therefore sharing all of their polymorphic alleles) or fraternal (dizygotic (DZ), i.e. developing from two fertilized eggs and therefore sharing on average 50% of their alleles, the same level of genetic similarity found in non-twin siblings). These known differences in genetic similarity, together with a testable assumption of equal environments for identical and fraternal twins, creates the basis for the design of twin studies aimed at estimating the overall effects of genes and environment on a phenotype.

The basic logic of the twin study can be understood with very little mathematical knowledge beyond an understanding of the concepts of variance and thence derived correlation.

=== Classical twin method ===
Like all behavior genetic research, the classical twin study begins by assessing the variance of behavior (called a phenotype by geneticists) in a large group, and attempts to estimate how much of this is due to:

- genetic effects (heritability)
- shared environment – events that happen to both twins, affecting them in the same way
- unshared, or unique, or nonshared environment – events that occur to one twin but not the other, or events that affect either twin in a different way.

Typically these three components are called A (additive genetics) C (common environment) and E (unique environment); hence the acronym ACE. It is also possible to examine non-additive genetics effects (often denoted D for dominance (ADE model); see below for more complex twin designs).

The ACE model indicates what proportion of variance in a trait is heritable, versus the proportion due to a shared environment or unshared environment. Research is typically carried out using Structural equation modeling (SEM) programs such as OpenMx capable in principle of handling all sorts of complex pedigrees. However the core logic underlying such programs is the same as the one underlying the twin design described here.

Monozygotic (identical – MZ) twins raised in a family share 100% of their genes, and all of their shared environment. Any differences arising between them in these circumstances are random (i.e. due to environmental effects unique to each twin). The correlation between identical twins provides an estimate of A + C. Dizygotic (DZ) twins also share C, but share, on average only 50% of their genes: so the correlation between fraternal twins is a direct estimate of ½(A)+C. If we denote with r the correlation, we can define r_{mz} and r_{dz} as the correlations of a trait among identical and fraternal twins, respectively. For any particular trait, then:

r_{mz} = A + C

r_{dz} = ½A + C

Stated again, the difference between these two sums then allows us to solve for A and C (and as a consequence, for E). As the difference between the identical and fraternal correlations is due entirely to a halving of the genetic similarity, the additive genetic effect A is twice the difference between the identical and fraternal correlations:

A = 2 (r_{mz} − r_{dz})

given the estimate for A, the one for C can be derived, for instance, from the first equation:

C = r_{mz} − A

Finally, since the trait correlation among identical twins reflects the full contribution of A and C, the residual variation E can be estimated by subtracting this correlation from 1

E = 1 − r_{mz}.

To summarize therefore, the additive genetic factor A is twice the difference between MZ and DZ twin correlations (this is known as Falconer's formula), C is the MZ twin correlation minus this estimate of A, and the random (unique) factor E is (1 - r_{mz}), i.e. MZ twins differ due to unique environments only (Jinks & Fulker, 1970; Plomin, DeFries, McClearn, & McGuffin, 2001).

=== Modern modeling ===
Beginning in the 1970s, research transitioned to modeling genetic, environmental effects using maximum likelihood methods (Martin & Eaves, 1977). While computationally much more complex, this approach has numerous benefits rendering it almost universal in current research.

An example structural model (for the heritability of height among Danish males) is shown:

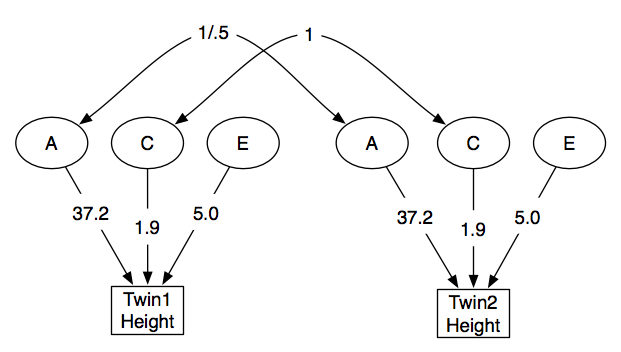
A: ACE model showing raw (non-standardised) variance coefficients

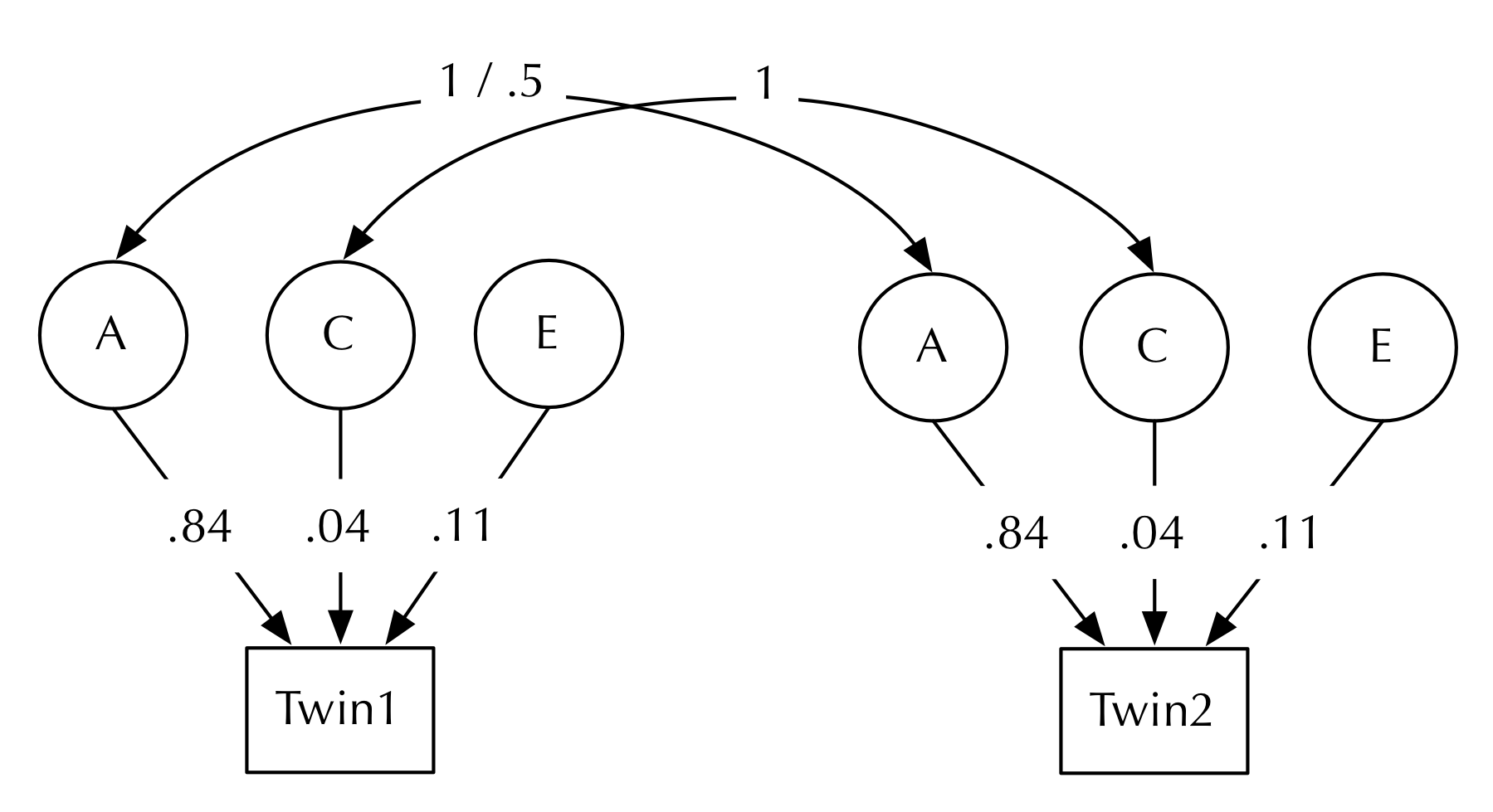
B: ACE model showing standardised variance coefficients

Model A on the left shows the raw variance in height. This is useful as it preserves the absolute effects of genes and environments, and expresses these in natural units, such as mm of height change. Sometimes it is helpful to standardize the parameters, so each is expressed as percentage of total variance. Because we have decomposed variance into A, C, and E, the total variance is simply A + C + E. We can then scale each of the single parameters as a proportion of this total, i.e., Standardised–A = A/(A + C + E). Heritability is the standardised genetic effect.

==== Model comparison ====
A principal benefit of modeling is the ability to explicitly compare models: Rather than simply returning a value for each component, the modeler can compute confidence intervals on parameters, but, crucially, can drop and add paths and test the effect via statistics such as the AIC. Thus, for instance to test for predicted effects of family or shared environment on behavior, an AE model can be objectively compared to a full ACE model. For example, we can ask of the figure above for height: Can C (shared environment) be dropped without significant loss of fit? Alternatively, confidence intervals can be calculated for each path.

==== Multi-group and multivariate modeling ====
Multivariate modeling can give answers to questions about the genetic relationship between variables that appear independent. For instance: do IQ and long-term memory share genes? Do they share environmental causes? Additional benefits include the ability to deal with interval, threshold, and continuous data, retaining full information from data with missing values, integrating the latent modeling with measured variables, be they measured environments, or, now, measured molecular genetic markers such as SNPs. In addition, models avoid constraint problems in the crude correlation method: all parameters will lie, as they should, between 0–1 (standardized).

Multivariate, and multiple-time wave studies, with measured environment and repeated measures of potentially causal behaviours are now the norm. Examples of these models include extended twin designs, simplex models, and growth-curve models.

==== Modeling the environment: MZ discordant designs ====
As MZ twins share both their genes and their family-level environmental factors, any differences between MZ twins reflect E: the unique environment. Researchers can use this information to understand the environment in powerful ways, allowing epidemiological tests of causality that are otherwise typically confounded by factors such as gene–environment covariance, reverse causation and confounding.

An example of a positive MZ discordant effect is shown below on the left. The twin who scores higher on trait 1 also scores higher on trait 2. This is compatible with a "dose" of trait 1 causing an increase in trait 2. Of course, trait 2 might also be affecting trait 1. Disentangling these two possibilities requires a different design (see below for an example). A null result is incompatible with a causal hypothesis.

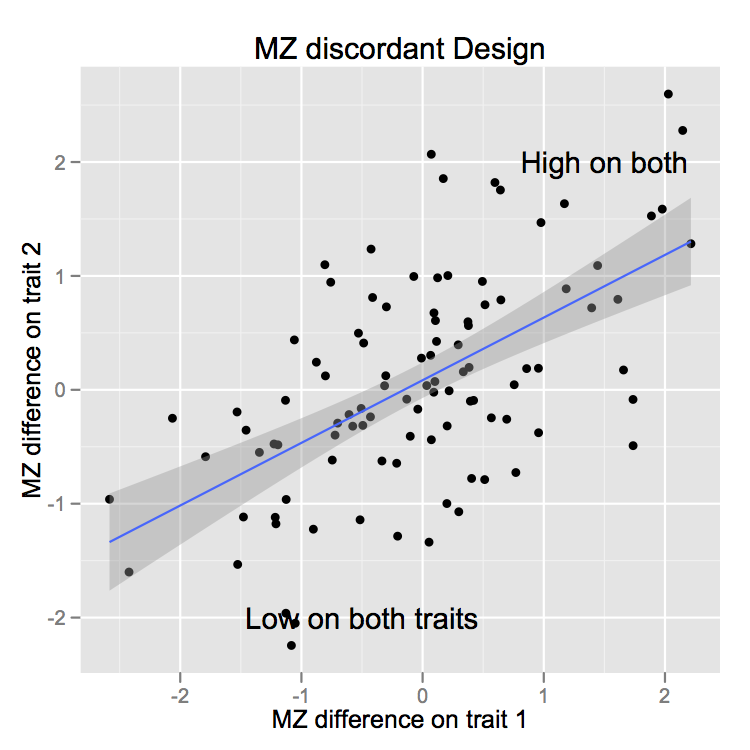
A depiction of MZ-discordance data

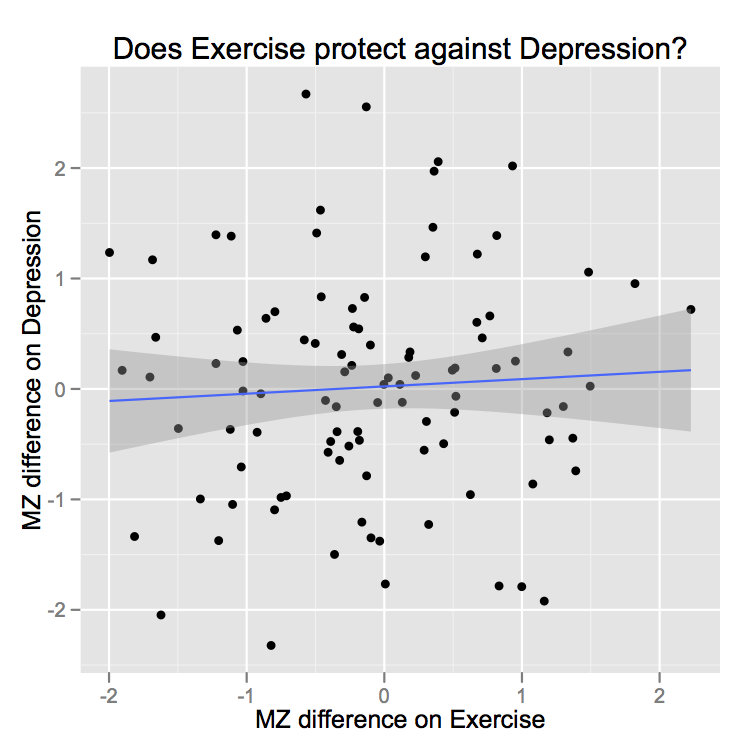
MZ discordant test of hypothesis that exercise protects against depression

Take for instance the case of an observed link between depression and exercise (See Figure above on right). People who are depressed also report doing little physical activity. One might hypothesise that this is a causal link: that "dosing" patients with exercise would raise their mood and protect against depression. The next figure shows what empirical tests of this hypothesis have found: a null result.

Longitudinal discordance designs

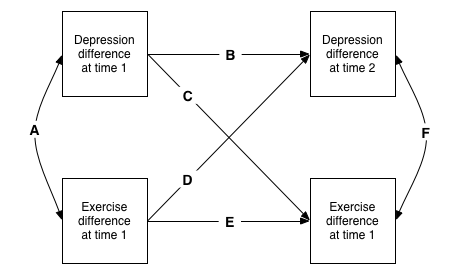
A cross-lagged longitudinal MZ discordant twin design. This model can take account of relationships among differences across traits at time one, and then examine the distinct hypotheses that increments in trait1 drive subsequent change in that trait in the future, or, importantly, in other traits.

As may be seen in the next Figure, this design can be extended to multiple measurements, with consequent increase in the kinds of information that one can learn. This is called a cross-lagged model (multiple traits measured over more than one time).

In the longitudinal discordance model, differences between identical twins can be used to take account of relationships among differences across traits at time one (path A), and then examine the distinct hypotheses that increments in trait1 drive subsequent change in that trait in the future (paths B and E), or, importantly, in other traits (paths C & D). In the example, the hypothesis that the observed correlation where depressed persons often also exercise less than average is causal, can be tested. If exercise is protective against depression, then path D should be significant, with a twin who exercises more showing less depression as a consequence.

=== Assumptions ===
It can be seen from the modeling above, the main assumption of the twin study is that of equal family environments, also known as the equal environments assumption. A special ability to test this assumption occurs where parents believe their twins to be non-identical when in fact they are genetically identical. Studies of a range of psychological traits indicate that these children remain as concordant as MZ twins raised by parents who treated them as identical.

Molecular genetic methods of heritability estimation have tended to produce lower estimates than classical twin studies due to modern SNP arrays not capturing the influence of certain types of variants (e.g., rare variants or repeat polymorphsisms), though some have suggested it is because twin studies overestimate heritability. A 2016 study determined that the assumption that the prenatal environment of twins was equal was largely tenable. Researchers continue to debate whether or not the equal environment assumption is valid.

==== Measured similarity: A direct test of assumptions in twin designs ====
A particularly powerful technique for testing the twin method was reported by Visscher et al. Instead of using twins, this group took advantage of the fact that while siblings on average share 50% of their genes, the actual gene-sharing for individual sibling pairs varies around this value, essentially creating a continuum of genetic similarity or "twinness" within families.

=== Sex differences ===
Genetic factors, including both gene expression and the range of gene × environment interactions, may differ between the sexes. Fraternal opposite sex twin pairs are invaluable in explicating these effects.

In an extreme case, a gene may only be expressed in one sex (qualitative sex limitation). More commonly, the effects of particular alleles may depend on the sex of the individual. A gene might cause a change of 100 g in weight in males, but perhaps 150 g in females – a quantitative gene effect.

Environments may impact on the ability of genes to express themselves and may do this via sex differences. For instance, genes affecting voting behavior would have no effect in females if females are excluded from the vote. More generally, the logic of sex-difference testing can extend to any defined sub-group of individuals. In cases such as these, the correlation for same and opposite sex DZ twins will differ, betraying the effect of the sex difference.

For this reason, it is normal to distinguish three types of fraternal twins. A standard analytic workflow would involve testing for sex-limitation by fitting models to five groups, identical male, identical female, fraternal male, fraternal female, and fraternal opposite sex. Twin modeling thus goes beyond correlation to test causal models involving potential causal variables, such as sex.

=== Gene × environment interactions ===
Gene effects may often be dependent on the environment. Such interactions are known as G×E interactions, in which the effects of a gene allele differ across different environments. Simple examples would include situations where a gene multiplies the effect of an environment: perhaps adding 1 inch to height in high nutrient environments, but only half an inch to height in low-nutrient environments. This is seen in different slopes of response to an environment for different genotypes.

Often researchers are interested in changes in heritability under different conditions: In environments where alleles can drive large phenotypic effects (as above), the relative role of genes will increase, corresponding to higher heritability in these environments.

A second effect is G × E correlation, in which certain alleles tend to accompany certain environments. If a gene causes a parent to enjoy reading, then children inheriting this allele are likely to be raised in households with books due to GE correlation: one or both of their parents has the allele and therefore will accumulate a book collection and pass on the book-reading allele. Such effects can be tested by measuring the purported environmental correlate (in this case books in the home) directly.

Often the role of environment seems maximal very early in life, and decreases rapidly after compulsory education begins. This is observed for instance in reading as well as intelligence. This is an example of a G*Age effect and allows an examination of both GE correlations due to parental environments (these are broken up with time), and of G*E correlations caused by individuals actively seeking certain environments.

==== Norms of reaction ====
Studies in plants or in animal breeding allow the effects of experimentally randomized genotypes and environment combinations to be measured. By contrast, human studies are typically observational. This may suggest that norms of reaction cannot be evaluated.

As in other fields such as economics and epidemiology, several designs have been developed to capitalise on the ability to use differential gene-sharing, repeated exposures, and measured exposure to environments (such as children social status, chaos in the family, availability and quality of education, nutrition, toxins etc.) to combat this confounding of causes. An inherent appeal of the classic twin design is that it begins to untangle these confounds. For example, in identical and fraternal twins shared environment and genetic effects are not confounded, as they are in non-twin familial studies. Twin studies are thus in part motivated by an attempt to take advantage of the random assortment of genes between members of a family to help understand these correlations.

While the twin study tells us only how genes and families affect behavior within the observed range of environments, and with the caveat that often genes and environments will covary, this is a considerable advance over the alternative, which is no knowledge of the different roles of genes and environment whatsoever. Twin studies are therefore often used as a method of controlling at least one part of this observed variance: Partitioning, for instance, what might previously have been assumed to be family environment into shared environment and additive genetics using the experiment of fully and partly shared genomes in twins. Additional information is available outside the classic twin design. Adoption designs are a form of natural experiment that tests norms of reaction by placing the same genotype in different environments. Association studies, e.g., allow direct study of allelic effects. Mendelian randomization of alleles also provides opportunities to study the effects of alleles at random with respect to their associated environments and other genes.

=== Extended twin designs and more complex genetic models ===
The basic or classical twin-design contains only identical and fraternal twins raised in their biological family. This represents only a sub-set of the possible genetic and environmental relationships. It is fair to say, therefore, that the heritability estimates from twin designs represent a first step in understanding the genetics of behavior.

The variance partitioning of the twin study into additive genetic, shared, and unshared environment is a first approximation to a complete analysis taking into account gene–environment covariance and interaction, as well as other non-additive effects on behavior. The revolution in molecular genetics has provided more effective tools for describing the genome, and many researchers are pursuing molecular genetics in order to directly assess the influence of alleles and environments on traits.

An initial limitation of the twin design is that it does not afford an opportunity to consider both Shared Environment and Non-additive genetic effects simultaneously. This limit can be addressed by including additional siblings to the design.

A second limitation is that gene–environment correlation is not detectable as a distinct effect unless it is added to the model. Addressing this limit requires incorporating adoption models, or children-of-twins designs, to assess family influences uncorrelated with shared genetic effects.

==== Continuous variables and ordinal variables ====
While concordance studies compare traits either present or absent in each twin, correlational studies compare the agreement in continuously varying traits across twins.

== Criticism ==
The twin method has been subject to criticism from statistical genetics, statistics and psychology, with some researchers, such as Burt & Simons (2014), arguing that conclusions reached via this method are ambiguous or meaningless. Core elements of these criticisms and their rejoinders are listed below.

=== Criticisms of fundamental assumptions ===
Critics of twin studies argue that they are based on false or questionable assumptions, including that monozygotic twins share 100% of their genes and the equal environments assumption. On this basis, critics contend that twin studies tend to generate inflated or deflated estimates of heritability due to biological confounding factors and consistent underestimation of environmental variance. Other critics take a more moderate stance, arguing that the equal environments assumption is typically inaccurate, but that this inaccuracy tends to have only a modest effect on heritability estimates.

=== Criticisms of statistical methods ===
Peter Schönemann criticized methods for estimating heritability developed in the 1970s. He has also argued that the heritability estimate from a twin study may reflect factors other than shared genes. Using the statistical models published in Loehlin and Nichols (1976), the narrow HR-heritability of responses to the question "did you have your back rubbed" has been shown to work out to .92 heritable for males and .21 heritable for females, and the question "Did you wear sunglasses after dark?" is 130% heritable for males and 103% for females. Critics also contend that the concept of "heritability" estimated in twin studies is merely a statistical abstraction with no relationship to the underlying DNA and that the statistical underpinnings of twin research are invalid. Statistical critiques argue that heritability estimates used for most twin studies rest on restrictive assumptions that are usually not tested, and if they are, they are often contradicted by the data.

==== Responses to statistical critiques ====
Before computers, statisticians used methods that were computationally tractable, at the cost of known limitations. Since the 1980s these approximate statistical methods have been discarded. Modern twin methods based on structural equation modeling are not subject to the limitations and heritability estimates such as those noted above are mathematically impossible. Critically, the newer methods allow for explicit testing of the role of different pathways and incorporation and testing of complex effects.

=== Sampling: Twins as representative members of the population ===
Results of twin studies cannot be automatically generalized beyond the population they come from. It is therefore important to understand the particular sample studied, and the nature of twins themselves. Twins are not a random sample of the population, and they differ in their developmental environment. In this sense they are not representative.

For example: Dizygotic (DZ) twin births are affected by many factors. Some women frequently produce more than one egg at each menstrual period and are therefore more likely to have twins. This tendency may run in the family either on the mother's or father's side, and often runs through both. Women over the age of 35 are more likely to produce two eggs. Women who have three or more children are also likely to have dizygotic twins. Artificial induction of ovulation and in vitro fertilization-embryo replacement can also give rise to fraternal and identical twins.

==== Response to representativeness of twins ====
However, twins differ very little from non-twin siblings. Measured studies on the personality and intelligence of twins suggest that they have scores on these traits very similar to those of non-twins (for instance Deary et al. 2006).

=== Separated twin pairs as representative of other twins ===
Separated twin pairs, identical or fraternal, are generally separated by adoption. This makes their families of origin non-representative of typical twin families in that they give up their children for adoption. The families they are adopted to are also non-representative of typical twin families in that they are all approved for adoption by children's protection authorities and that a disproportionally large fraction of them have no biological children. Those who volunteer to studies are not even representative of separated twins in general since not all separated twins agree to be part of twin studies.

== Terminology ==
=== Pairwise concordance ===
For a group of twins, pairwise concordance is defined as C/(C+D), where C is the number of concordant pairs and D is the number of discordant pairs.

For example, a group of 10 twins have been pre-selected to have one affected member (of the pair). During the course of the study four other previously non-affected members become affected, giving a pairwise concordance of 4/(4+6) or 4/10 or 40%.

=== Probandwise concordance ===
For a group of twins in which at least one member of each pair is affected, probandwise concordance is a measure of the proportion of twins who have the illness who have an affected twin and can be calculated with the formula of 2C/(2C+D), in which C is the number of concordant pairs and D is the number of discordant pairs.

For example, consider a group of 10 twins that have been pre-selected to have one affected member. During the course of the study, four other previously non-affected members become affected, giving a probandwise concordance of 8/(8+6) or 8/14 or 57%.

== Higher twin births rates ==
Some areas have twin birth rates far above the global average—up to six times higher than elsewhere, with hundreds of twin pairs among just a few thousand families. This phenomenon is not seen in nearby villages, making it a highly localized mystery.

Despite early theories attributing high twinning rates to genetic, environmental, or dietary factors, research concluded that these occurrences are best explained by statistical probability. His findings suggest that a 1% global twin birth rate means certain areas will naturally show higher rates simply due to chance—akin to long streaks in coin tosses—without requiring any special biological or environmental explanation. Extensive studies have failed to identify unique genetic markers or external causes, reinforcing the argument that high twin birth rates are random statistical outliers, not evidence of hidden factors, and reminding us that human tendency to seek patterns often overlooks the role of pure chance in nature.

== See also ==
- Behavioral genetics
- "Burt Affair"
- Gene-environment interaction
- Gene-environment correlation
- Genome-wide complex trait analysis
- Heritability
- Heritability of IQ
- Human nature
- Identical Strangers: A Memoir of Twins Separated and Reunited
- Kaiser Wilhelm Institute of Anthropology, Human Heredity, and Eugenics
- Michigan State University Twin Registry
- Minnesota Twin Family Study
- Nature versus nurture
- Otmar Freiherr von Verschuer
- The Parent Trap
- Quantitative genetics
- Differential susceptibility
- Three Identical Strangers
- Twin registry
- TwinsUk
