= Interactionism (nature versus nurture) =

View that behavior develops from both

In the context of the nature-nurture debate, interactionism is the view that all human behavioral traits develop from the interaction of both "nature" and "nurture", that is, from both genetic and environmental factors. This view further holds that genetic and environmental influences on organismal development are so closely interdependent that they are inseparable from one another. Historically, it has often been confused with the statistical concept of gene-environment interaction. Historically, interactionism has presented a limited view of the manner in which behavioral traits develop, and has simply demonstrated that "nature" and "nurture" are both necessary. Among the first biologists to propose an interactionist theory of development was Daniel Lehrman. Since then, numerous interactionist perspectives have been proposed, and the contradictions between many of these perspectives has led to much controversy in evolutionary psychology and behavioral genetics. Proponents of various forms of interactionist perspectives include Philip Kitcher, who refers to his view as "causal democracy", and Susan Oyama, who describes her perspective as "constructive interactionism". Critics of interactionism include major figures in behavioral genetics such as Arthur Jensen, Robert Plomin, and philosopher Neven Sesardic.

== Interactionist perspective to depression ==
Depression is not dependent entirely on genetic nor environmental influences alone to trigger its onset. Both genetic and environmental factors work accompanied to transform a vulnerability to depression to be expressed in its actuality. Research has demonstrated the synchrony of polygenic scores of major depressive disorders (MDD) with stressful life events and social support to increase the probability of developing depression. Although Monroe and Simons criticize interactionism for a lack of precise measurement to grasp its 'conceptual essence', there's been numerous studies surrounding gene by environment interaction commonly focussing on candidate genes such as genetic variation within the serotonin transporter (SLC6A4) gene. As MDD is a polygenic trait its development is dependent on variations of a range of genes each exhibiting small effect sizes. Peyrot et al. also found increased polygenic risk scores and genetic vulnerability in the presence of childhood trauma demonstrating the collaboration between environmental and genetic stressors.

In the instance of personal life events however, whether they were passive or active trauma has a mediating effect on the heritability of the disorder. When passive, meaning the individual played less of an active in their trauma i.e., illness or accident, the heritability wasn't as severe than when active i.e., in cases of separation, relationship conflict, financial or legal trouble. Contrarily, Mullins found whilst polygenic risk scores and stressful events were predictors of depression, however he believed them to be isolated factors acting independently.

The combined therapy (psychotherapy with pharmacotherapy) for depression demonstrates statistically significant improvement compared with psychotherapy and pharmacotherapy. This is the value of considering both genetic and environmental factors in the explanation for depression. However, its effectiveness depends on the severity and chronicity of depression. For mild and moderate non-chronic depression, the combined therapy has no differences from a single therapy. Whilst results in the field are unreliable, research generally points in favour of the compatibility between genetic and environmental contributors to psychopathology and depression.

== Interactionist perspective to PTSD ==
Ecological, biological, and residual stress pathways interact in order to manifest post-traumatic stress disorder (PTSD), the experience of trauma being the primary contributor to PTSD. The severity of trauma is a prime factor to the onset of PTSD but the question as to why only a fraction of individuals who experience trauma develop a pathological response whilst others do not rest in the assumptions that it is the combination of both genetic vulnerability that exhibit PTSD in alliance with environmental trauma. Among those who experience extreme severities of PTSD such as violent crimes, assault, severe accidents, approximately 3-35% develop symptoms. As inherent vulnerability increases the threshold for the environmental trauma to trigger the disorder decreases.

Residual stress is a key factor in the expression of PTSD, it is the initial and prolonged effects of trauma and a catalyst in its development. Ecological and biological pathways are also preceding factors that increase the likelihood of PTSD following trauma and residual stress. Ecological pathways include both personal and environmental influences such as coping mechanisms, interpersonal support, and the individual's environment. And biological pathways include neurological anomalies, inherited traits, and structural anomalies such as hippocampal atrophy. Ecological and biological factors provide a predisposition whilst residual stress triggers its onset.

Greater trauma leads to greater levels of residual stress, and trauma can be divided into pre-trauma i.e., childhood abuse, and post-trauma i.e., social support, in which females are more influenced by post-trauma than their male counterparts in the development of PTSD. For example, survivors of sexual abuse found PTSD was influenced considerably by familial nature of support, negative parental reactions were found to intensify PTSD whereas high levels of social support helped diminish psychological fallout and recovery time. Ecological pathways include factors such as a history of abuse, physical and sexual. Women with a history of physical abuse were found to be 5x more likely to have a history of PTSD, 10x more susceptible to experiencing it then controls. Parental abuse is a predictor for future anti-social behaviour and decreased social skills, and maladaptive social information processing increasing sensitivity to PTSD. These environmental factors aside from residual stress generate maladaptive cognitive patterns that provide a 'breaking point' to individuals with genetic vulnerability to PTSD to exhibit the disorder.

Biological pathways include a diversity of factors including hormonal and neurotransmitter abnormalities, and alterations in neural structure. Male adults of PTSD were found to have higher urinary biproduct of norepinephrine and epinephrine (adrenaline), lower cortisol levels, and abnormalities in neurotransmitter levels associated with anger, hostility and depression related to PTSD. Increased norepinephrine is involved with the activation of traumatic memories, and increased catecholamines are what led to increased levels of stress-related hormones such as cortisol, and neurotransmitters associated with PTSD, which in the instance of trauma increases one's vulnerability to it. Furthermore, structural alterations increase the susceptibility of PTSD, for example, sexually abused adolescent girls and those generally maltreated in comparison to a control group had dysregulation within their hypothalamic pituitary adrenal axis (HPA) alongside decreased hippocampal volume. Furthermore, corticotropin releasing hormone (CRH) increases heart rate and enhances fear conditioning and is also the hormone responsible for regulating the HPA axis which corresponds with symptoms of PTSD.

== Interactionist perspective to Schizophrenia ==
=== Background ===
Twin studies that investigated the development of schizophrenia found that identical twins have a higher concordance rate for schizophrenia than non-identical twins. However, none of them found a 100% concordance rate from identical twins. Identical twins have exact genes. This suggests the development of schizophrenia is not only due to genetic factors but also environmental factors. On the other hand, in an adoption study, participants were adopted at a young age by families without a schizophrenia history. Children with genetic risks (such as having a genetic schizophrenia mother) were more sensitive to negative child-raring styles than those with no genetic risk. They are more likely to develop schizophrenia in undesirable child-raring style families. This suggests the role of genetic factors in the development of schizophrenia. Therefore, researchers consider the interaction of genetic and environmental factors to explain schizophrenia. This is also the tendency of psychologists to research mental disorders.

=== Diathesis stress model ===
The diathesis-stress model is an interactionism approach. In the context of schizophrenia, diathesis is the vulnerability. Vulnerabilities can be either genetic predisposition or early experiences, or both. Stressors are any event that can trigger a schizophrenia-vulnerable individual to the onset of the condition. This interactionism approach explains why people with similar genes or traumatic experiences, do not necessarily develop schizophrenia together.

==== Early diathesis-stress model ====
The early diathesis-stress model was developed by Meehl. It suggested that diathesis was a single gene, called schizogene. It led to a personality development, called schizotypic personality. Individuals who did not have schizotypic personality would not express the symptoms of schizophrenia, no matter what stress they experienced. However, once a schizotypic personality, the stress from the family could trigger schizophrenia. This model is over-simple. First, more recent research found that 108 genes are associated with the development of schizophrenia. No schizogene determines schizophrenia, it is a polygenic mental disorder. Second, the stressors are not limited to the problematic family environment. They can be any negative experience in life. For example, childhood traumas, low socioeconomic status, substance misuse...

==== Modern diathesis-stress model ====
However, the concept of the diathesis-stress model did not be given up. Researchers make it more comprehensive. The research suggests that genetic defect leads to biological vulnerability. This schizophrenia–vulnerable individual's dopamine (DA) receptors and hippocampus area were abnormal. Later, stressful experiences (the stressor) can activate their hypothalamic pituitary adrenal (HPA) axis. This leads to the release of cortisol. This release of cortisol can further disrupt that abnormal DA system. According to the dopamine hypothesis, the DA system abnormality is associated with the symptoms of schizophrenia. Stressors also further damage the hippocampus of vulnerable individuals. Schizophrenia patients have a smaller volume of the hippocampus compared with a typical brain Moreover, stressors also cause patient more sensitive to stress in everyday life, this is a vicious cycle. Therefore, the stressors are not just a trigger of schizophrenia but also lead to deterioration.

In the more comprehensive model, diathesis is not just genetic. Early childhood traumas can also lead to psychological vulnerability. This traumatic experience can be child abuse and neglect. For example, Read found that 69% of women and 59% of male schizophrenia patients experienced childhood abuse (physical abuse, sexual abuse or both). This experience impacts the early development of the brain. For example, disrupts the HPA, DA and hippocampal systems. This can create a similar vulnerability to that created by genes.

Similarly, stressors are not just subjective negative life experiences. For example, using cannabis can be a stressor that triggers schizophrenia-vulnerable individuals to develop schizophrenics. Houston found that sexual abuse had a significant correlation with the development of schizophrenia, only if the patients used cannabis. This can be because cannabis influences the dopamine system. However, to the patients, the reason for using substances such as cannabis is for enjoyment. Therefore, stressors are now defined as all events that can trigger vulnerable individuals to express schizophrenia symptoms. However, not all smokers develop schizophrenia. Thus, using cannabis is only considered as a stressor but not a cause.

=== Application of interactionism approach to schizophrenia ===
The diathesis-stress model supports a reason for using combined therapy for schizophrenia treatment. If not approved the interactionism approach, there is no reason to use the combined therapy. For example, if therapists propose schizophrenia is due to genetic reasons. Then, it is difficult to convince the patients to participate in drug treatment followed by psychological treatment, and vice versa. However, combined therapy demonstrates statistically significant improvement in reducing schizophrenia symptoms compared to a single treatment. Although it did not indicate the effect of reducing the relapse rate.

==== Criticism of the application ====
Recent research has a better understanding of the diathesis-stress model to explain schizophrenia. However, the mechanism by which vulnerability and stressors contribute to the development of schizophrenia remains unclear. Therefore, the interactionist treatment (combined therapy) just simply combines psychotherapy and pharmacotherapy. This may be attributed to the reason why combined therapy does not always have statistically significant improvement in mitigating schizophrenia symptoms compared to drug therapy. In the case of combined therapy, it is more expensive than a single therapy. This unstable effectiveness can impact its promotion because it lacks cost-effectiveness.

Moreover, the significant improvement of the combined therapy can simply be because the effect of their own is added up. It does not necessarily mean there is an interaction effect between these two treatments. There can be a treatment causation fallacy.

== See also ==
- Flynn effect
- Heritability
- Diathesis-stress model
- Social information processing
