= Judith Rich Harris =

American psychology researcher (1938–2018)

- Born: Judith Rich; February 10, 1938; Brooklyn, New York, U.S.
- Died: December 29, 2018 (aged 80); Middletown, New Jersey, U.S.
- Known for: The Nurture Assumption, No Two Alike
- Spouse: Charles S. Harris
- Awards: George A. Miller Award
- Website: judithrichharris.info

Judith Rich Harris (February 10, 1938 – December 29, 2018) was an American psychology researcher and the author of The Nurture Assumption, a book criticizing the belief that parents are the most important factor in child development, and presenting evidence which contradicts that belief. Harris was a resident of Middletown Township, New Jersey.

== Early life and education ==
Born in Brooklyn in 1938, Harris spent her early childhood moving around the United States until her parents eventually settled in Tucson, Arizona. The dry climate suited her father, who had ankylosing spondylitis, an autoimmune disease.

Harris graduated from Tucson High School and attended the University of Arizona, and then Brandeis University where she graduated magna cum laude in 1959. Harris was dismissed from the Ph.D. program in psychology at Harvard University in 1960, because the 'originality and independence' of her work were not to Harvard's standards. She was granted a master's degree in her field, before departing.

== Research: 1977–1995 ==
In the late 1970s, Harris developed a mathematical model of visual information processing which formed the basis for two articles in the journal Perception and Psychophysics (1979, 1984).

After 1981 she focused on textbooks about developmental psychology. With Robert Liebert, she co-authored The Child (Prentice-Hall, 1984) and Infant and Child (1992).

In 1994 she formulated a new theory of child development, focusing on the peer group rather than the family. This formed the basis for a 1995 article in the Psychological Review, which received the American Psychological Association's George A. Miller Award for an Outstanding Recent Article in General Psychology. George A. Miller was chair of the Department of Psychology at Harvard in 1960, when Harris was dismissed from that Ph.D. program (see above)

Is it dangerous to claim that parents have no power at all (other than genetic) to shape their child's personality, intelligence, or the way he or she behaves outside the family home? ... A confession: When I first made this proposal ten years ago, I didn't fully believe it myself. I took an extreme position, the null hypothesis of zero parental influence, for the sake of scientific clarity. ... The establishment's failure to shoot me down has been nothing short of astonishing.

— Judith Rich Harris, 2006.

== The Nurture Assumption ==
Harris's most famous work, The Nurture Assumption, was first published in 1998, with a revised version published in 2009.

In this book, she challenges the idea that the personality of adults is determined chiefly by the way they were raised by their parents. She looks at studies which claim to show the influence of the parental environment and claims that most fail to control for genetic influences. For example, if aggressive parents are more likely to have aggressive children, this is not necessarily evidence of parental example; it may also be that aggressiveness has been passed down through the genes. She also points out that correlations between parent and child personalities may result as easily from child-to-parent effects as the reverse. As part of her presentation, she also argues against Frank Sulloway's theory of the effects of birth order. The book looks to influences outside the home as the primary socializing agents of children, with peers being particularly important in personality development. Harris argues that children identify with their classmates and playmates rather than their parents and other adults, and that personality is formed both through efforts to fit in with the group or to compete with specific others.

== No Two Alike ==
No Two Alike: Human Nature and Human Individuality, was published in February 2006. Harris attempts to explain why people are so different in personality, even identical twins who grow up in the same home.

She proposes that three distinct systems shape personality:

- A relationship system allows us to distinguish family from strangers and tell individuals apart.
- A socialization system helps us to become members of a group and absorb the group's culture.
- A status system enables us to acquire self-knowledge by measuring ourselves against others.

No Two Alike expands on some of the ideas from The Nurture Assumption and attempts to answer some of the criticisms leveled at the former book. For example, Harris denies that the message of 'The Nurture Assumption' is that "Parents are not important." Instead, she emphasizes that their importance lies not in shaping or determining the people their children will become, but in determining to a large extent the quality of their children's first important relationships (i.e., with their parents) and the quality of life within the home. Harris claims that a happy home life in itself is a positive good—not because it necessarily will determine a happy adulthood.

== Selected publications ==
- Harris, J. R., & Liebert, R. M. (1984, 1987, 1991). The Child: Development from Birth through Adolescence. Prentice Hall, ISBN 978-0-13-131046-9
- Harris, J. R., Shaw, M. L., & Altom, M. J. (1985). "Serial position curves for reaction time and accuracy in visual search: Tests of a model of overlapping processing." Perception & Psychophysics, 38, 178–187.
- Harris, J. R. (1995). "Where is the child's environment? A group socialization theory of development". Psychological Review, 102, 458–489.
- Harris, J. R. (1998). The nurture assumption: Why children turn out the way they do. Free Press, ISBN 978-0-684-84409-1.
- Harris, J. R. (2000). Socialization, personality development, and the child's environments. Developmental Psychology, 36, 699–710.
- Harris, J. R. (2000). "Context-specific learning, personality, and birth order". Current Directions in Psychological Science, 9, 174–177.
- Harris, J. R. (2002, January 17). "Why do people believe that birth order has important effects on personality?" The Nurture Assumption Web Site. Retrieved 2007-08-27
- Harris, J. R. (2006). No Two Alike: Human Nature and Human Individuality. W.W. Norton, ISBN 978-0-393-05948-9

== Personal life ==
She married Charles S. Harris in 1961; they had two daughters (one adopted) and four grandchildren. Since 1977 Harris had suffered from a chronic autoimmune disorder, diagnosed as a combination of lupus and systemic sclerosis. Her friend and colleague, cognitive scientist Steven Pinker, reported her Dec. 29 death via Twitter on December 30, 2018.

== See also ==
- Nature versus nurture
