= Additive genetic effects =

Effect when genes source into a phenotype

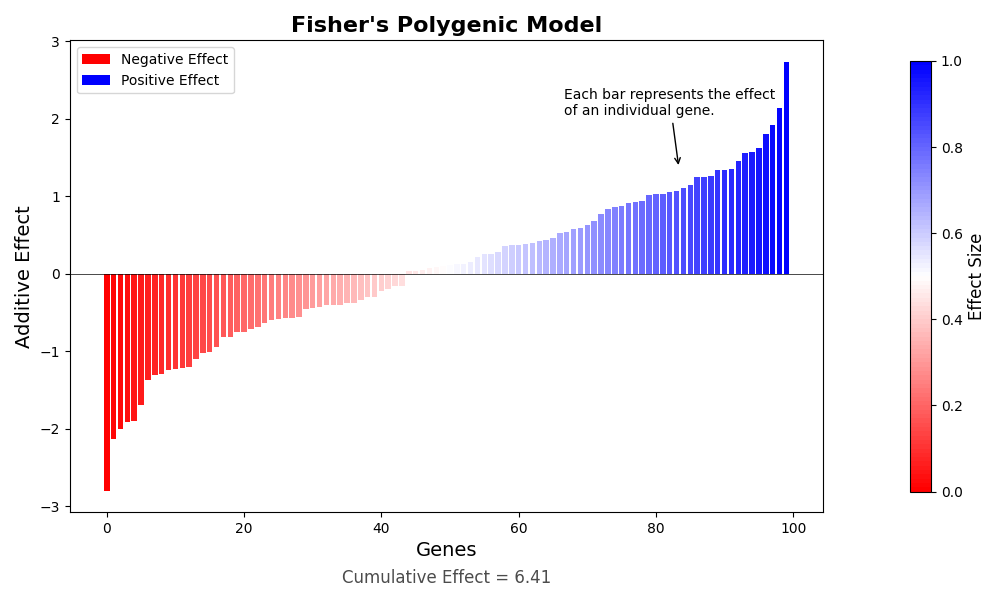
This model illustrates polygenic additive effects on phenotype

Genetic effects are broadly divided into two categories: additive and non-additive. Additive genetic effects occur where expression of more than one gene contributes to phenotype (or where alleles of a heterozygous gene both contribute), and the phenotypic expression of these genes can be said to be the sum of these contributions.

Non-additive effects involve dominance or epistasis, and cause outcomes that are not a sum of the contribution of the genes involved.

Additive genetic effects are singularly important with regard to quantitative traits, as the sum of these effects informs the placement of a trait on the spectrum of possible outcomes. Quantitative traits are commonly polygenic (resulting from the effects of more than one locus).

== Heritability ==
=== Broad sense heritability ===
Variation in phenotypes across a population arises from the interaction between environmental variation and genetic variation between individuals. This can be stated mathematically as:

V_{P} = V_{E} + V_{G}, where the terms refer to variation in phenotype, environment, and genotype respectively.

Broad sense heritability (H^{2}, or H_{B}) refers to the phenotypic differences arising from all genetic effects, and can be described as the ratio of genotypic variation to that of phenotypic variation in the population, or: H^{2} = V_{G} / V_{P}.

The genotypic variation from the above equation can be subdivided into V_{A} (additive effects), V_{D} (dominance effects), and V_{I} (epistatic effects).

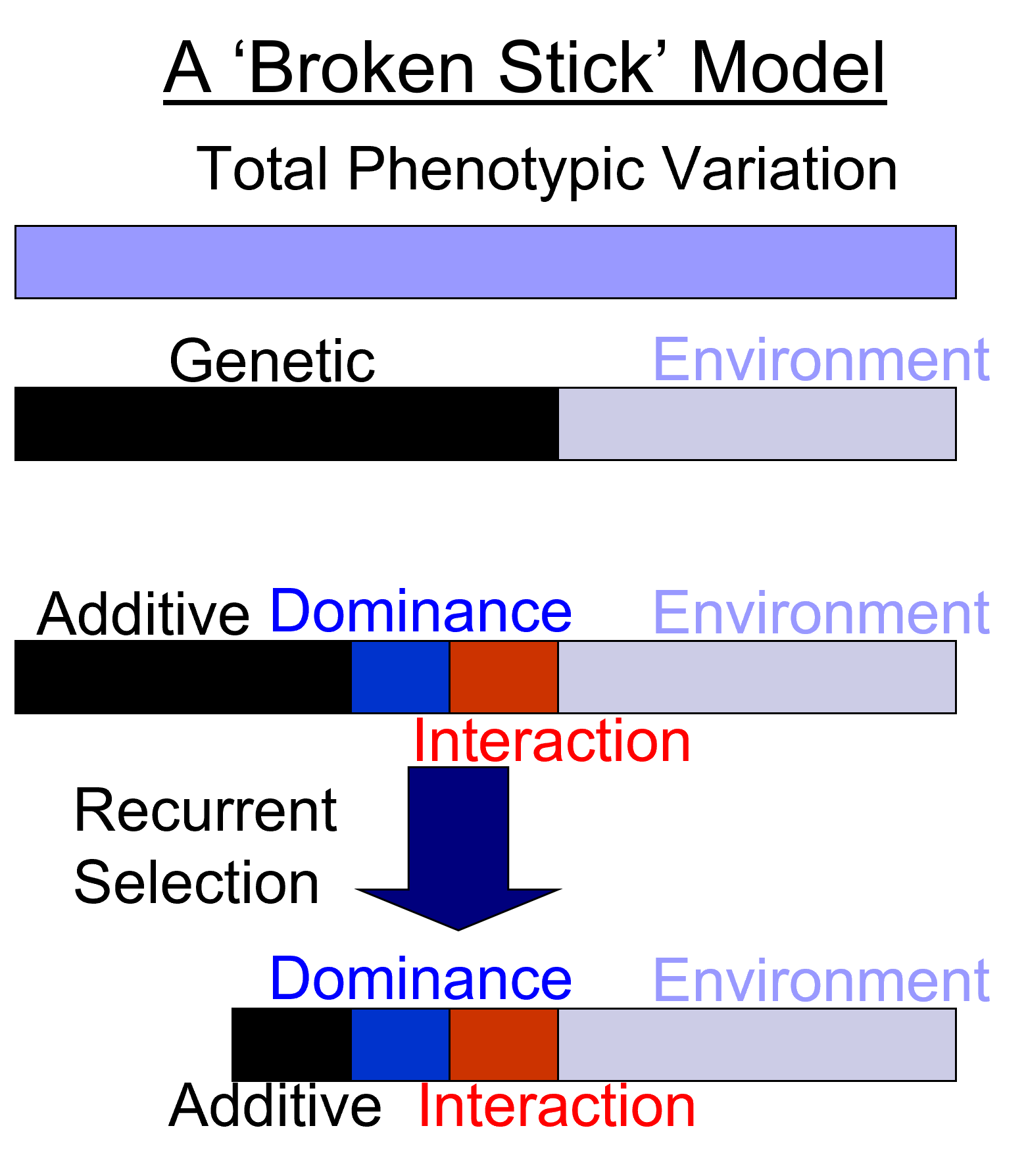
Visualization of the decreasing variation of additive effects to mean fitness over generations.

=== Narrow Sense Heritability ===
Narrow sense Heritability (h^{2} or H_{N}) focuses specifically on the ratio of additive variance (V_{A}) to total phenotypic variance (V_{P}), or: h^{2} = V_{A} / V_{P.}

In the study of Heritability, Additive genetic effects are of particular interest in the fields of Conservation, and Artificial selection. The effects of dominance and epistasis are not reliably transmitted to progeny (see Mendelian inheritance, laws of segregation and independent assortment). This means that h^{2} represents the phenotypic variation that is reliably passed from one generation to the next and which can be used to predict changes in mean fitness between generations.

== Fisher's Fundamental Theorem ==
Fisher's Fundamental Theorem asserts a direct correlation between the amount of genetic variation in a population and the possible variation in mean fitness for that population. This Theorem suggests that where a trait affects individual fitness, the amount of variation due to additive genetic effects will decline with each successive generation, and all other things being equal, will approach zero.
