= Helen Herrman =

Australian psychiatrist

Helen Edith Herrman AO is the President of the World Psychiatric Association. She is the second woman, and first Australian to be elected to the position.

Educated at Monash University, Herrman received an MD for her 1981 thesis, "An Epidemiological Study of Patients Diagnosed as Schizophrenic : Use of record-linkage to examine mortality and general hospital admission".

Herrman is Professor of Psychiatry at Orygen, the National Centre for Excellence in Youth Mental Health. She is also Director of the WHO Collaborating Centre for Mental Health in Melbourne.

Before moving to Orygen, Herrman was Professor and Director of Psychiatry at St Vincent's Hospital and the University of Melbourne.

== International appointments ==
Herrman was President of the International Association for Women's Mental Health (IAWMH) from 2015-2017.

Herrman is immediate Past President of the Pacific Rim College of Psychiatrists (PRCP).

In 2017 Herrman began her three-year term as President of the World Psychiatric Association (WPA).

== Recognition ==
In 2013 Herrman was inducted into the Victorian Honour Roll of Women.

The University of Melbourne awarded Herrman a Doctor of Medical Science (Honoris Causa) "in recognition of an outstanding career researching, providing education and clinical care and advising on the delivery of mental health services so that governments and societies might meet their moral obligations and economic targets".

In the 2017 Queen's Birthday Honours Herrman became an Officer of the Order of Australia "For distinguished service to medicine, and to mental health, as a leading clinician, researcher and scientist, to national and international professional organisations, and through programs to support youth and women."

== Bibliography ==
- Herrman, Helen; Saxena, Shekhar; Moodie, Rob; World Health Organization. Dept. of Mental Health and Substance Abuse; Victorian Health Promotion Foundation; University of Melbourne (2005), Promoting mental health : concepts, emerging evidence, practice, World Health Organization, ISBN 978-92-4-156294-2
- Herrman, Helen; Maj, Mario; Sartorius, N., eds. (31 August 2009). Depressive disorders (3rd ed.). Wiley-Blackwell (published 2009). ISBN 978-0-470-98720-9.
- Chandra, Prabha S; Herrman, Helen; Fisher, Jane E.; Kastrup, Marianne; Niaz, Unaiza; Rondon, Marta B.; Okasha, Ahmed, eds. (2009). Contemporary topics in women's mental health : global perspectives in a changing society. John Wiley. ISBN 978-0-470-74673-8.
- Ghodse, Hamid; Herrman, Helen; Maj, Mario; Sartorius, N., eds. (2011). Substance abuse disorders : evidence and experience. Wiley-Blackwell. ISBN 978-0-470-97508-4.
