= Yuting Zhang =

Australian professor

Yuting Zhang is a professor of health economics at the University of Melbourne, and an expert on economic evaluations of health policy and healthcare reforms. She is a journal editor, award recipient, and has written numerous articles in influential journals in her field.

== Biography ==
Yuting Zhang obtained her PhD in health policy (economics concentration) at Harvard University in 2007 and MS in health policy & management, also from Harvard University. She received her BA from Renmin University of China.

Zhang is currently a professor of health economics at the Melbourne Institute: Applied Economic & Social Research within the Faculty of Business and Economics at the University of Melbourne. She is currently the founding director for the Health Analytics, Leadership, and Economics (HALE) Hub. Before that, she was a tenured professor at the University of Pittsburgh. She was the founding director of the Pharmaceutical Economics Research Group since 2010.

Her expertise is with using advanced econometrics and statistical methods and large data sets to design rigorous observational studies to study the causal relationship between health policy/interventions and outcomes, including patient health, healthcare spending, and quality of care. These empirical studies are motivated by two overarching goals: first, to design studies to identify causal relationships between health policy/interventions and health outcomes rather than mere correlations; second, to provide guidance on how health policies can be designed to achieve efficiency and high quality of care in the healthcare system.

Her research areas include pharmaceutical policy and economics, mental health policy, value-based healthcare design, comparative effectiveness analysis, health insurance markets, the effect of healthcare reforms on healthcare spending and quality of care, and international health.

Zhang's research has been published in prestigious medicine, health policy, and economics journals such as the New England Journal of Medicine, Health Affairs, and the American Economic Review.

Zhang has been interviewed extensively by reporters from television or radio broadcast, magazines and newspapers, including The New York Times, The Wall Street Journal, American Health Line, USA Today Business Week, The Washington Post, ABC News and CBS News

She is on the advisory board of Lancet - Regional health west pacific, an associate editor of the Journal of Mental Health Policy and Economics, and an appointed method/statistical reviewer at JAMA Network Open. She has also served as a consulting advisor to the Institute of Medicine and the Centers for Medicare and Medicaid Services, and a reviewer for the NIH, Patient-Centered Outcomes Research Institute, and the US Medicare Payment Advisory Commission.

== Major projects ==
Zhang has led several large-scale projects with funding from the U.S. National Academies of Sciences, Engineering, and Medicine, the U.S. National Institutes of Health (NIH), Agency for Healthcare Research and Quality, and the Commonwealth Fund. Zhang is the recipient of an Australian Research Council Australian Future Fellowship award to study how to reform private health insurance in Australia.

== Selected publications ==
Zhang has published in hundreds of journals on the economics of public policy, including top economic and Health journals

- Kettlewell, Nathan; Zhang, Yuting (2024). "Financial incentives and private health insurance demand on the extensive and intensive margins". Journal of Health Economics. 94 102863. doi:10.1016/j.jhealeco.2024.102863. hdl:11343/343901.
- Zhang, Yuting (2024). "How can the Australian government make primary care and private health insurance more affordable?". Australian Economic Review. 57: 174–178. doi:10.1111/1467-8462.12553.
- Yang, Ou; Young, Jongsay; Zhang, Yuting (2024). "Effects of Private Health Insurance on Waiting Time in Public Hospitals". Health Economics. 33: 1192–1210. doi:10.1002/hec.4811. hdl:11343/345436.
- Kettlewell, Nathan; Zhang, Yuting (2024). "Age penalties and take-up of private health insurance". Health Economics. 33: 636–651. doi:10.1002/hec.4784.
- Liu, Judith; Zhang, Yuting (2023). "Elderly responses to private health insurance incentives: evidence from Australia". Health Economics. 32 (12): 2730–2744. doi:10.1002/hec.4751. hdl:11343/345435.
- Zhang, Y; Newhouse, JP; Baicker, K (May 2011). "Are Drugs Substitutes or Complements for Intensive (and Expensive) Medical Treatment?". American Economic Review. 101 (3): 393–97. doi:10.1257/aer.101.3.393. PMC 3778446. PMID 24058203.
- Zhang, Y; Baik, SH; Fendrick, AM; Baicker, K (2012). "Comparing local and regional variation in health care spending". N Engl J Med. 367: 1724–31. doi:10.1056/NEJMsa1203980. PMC 3490218. PMID 23113483..
- Zhang, Y; Baicker, K; Newhouse, JP (2010). "Geographic variation in the quality of prescribing". N Engl J Med. 363: 1985–8. doi:10.1056/NEJMp1010220. PMC 3047447. PMID 21047217.
- Zhang, Y; Baicker, K; Newhouse, JP (2010). "Geographic variation in Medicare drug spending". N Engl J Med. 363: 405–9. doi:10.1056/NEJMp1004872. PMC 3364516. PMID 20538621.
- Zhang, Y; Donohue, JM; Lave, JR; O'Donnell, G; Newhouse, JP (2009). "The effect of Medicare Part D on drug and medical spending". N Engl J Med. 361: 52–61. doi:10.1056/NEJMsa0807998. PMC 2859614. PMID 19571283..
- Liu, L; Zhang, Y (2017). "Does non-employment based health insurance promote entrepreneurship? Evidence from a policy experiment in China". Journal of Comparative Economics. 46: 270–283. doi:10.1016/j.jce.2017.04.003.
- Zhang, Y; Ma, Q; Chen, Y; Gao, H (2016). "Effects of Public Hospital Reforms on Inpatient Expenditures in Rural China". Health Economics. 26: 421–430. doi:10.1002/hec.3320.
- Kaplan, CM; Zhang, Y (2016). "Anticipatory Behavior In Response To Medicare Part D's Coverage Gap". Health Economics. 26: 338–351. doi:10.1002/hec.3311.
- Kaplan, CM; Zhang, Y (Nov 2014). "The January Effect: Medication Reinitiation among Medicare Part D Beneficiaries". Health Economics. 23 (11): 1287–300. doi:10.1002/hec.2981. PMC 3841288. PMID 23943539.
- Kaplan, C; Zhang, Y (2012). "Assessing the comparative-effectiveness of antidepressants commonly prescribed for depression in the US Medicare population". J Ment Health Policy Econ. 15: 171–8. PMC 3608926. PMID 23525835..
- Baik, SH; Rollman, BL; Reynolds, CF 3rd; Lave, JR; Smith, KJ; Zhang, Y (2012). "The effect of the US Medicare Part D coverage gaps on medication use among patients with depression and heart failure". J Ment Health Policy Econ. 15: 105–18. PMC 3471664. PMID 23001279..
- Zhang, Y (2008). "Cost-saving effects of olanzapine as long-term treatment for bipolar disorder". J Ment Health Policy Econ. 11: 135–46. PMC 3973179. PMID 18806303..
- Hodgkin, D; Parks Thomas, C; Simoni-Wastila, L; Ritter, GA; Lee, S (2008). "The effect of a three-tier formulary on antidepressant utilization and expenditures". J Ment Health Policy Econ. 11: 67–77. PMID 18509214..
- San-Juan-Rodriguez, A; Zhang, Y; He, M; Hernandez, I (2019). "Association of Antidementia Therapies with Time to Skilled Nursing Facility Admission and Cardiovascular Events among Elderly Adults with Alzheimer Disease". JAMA Network Open. 2 (3): e190213. doi:10.1001/jamanetworkopen.2019.0213. PMC 6484658.
- Hernandez, I; He, M; Brooks, M; Zhang, Y (2018). "Exposure-Response Association between Concurrent Opioid and Benzodiazepine Use and Risk of Opioid-Related Overdose in Medicare Part D Beneficiaries". JAMA Network Open. 1 (2): e180919. doi:10.1001/jamanetworkopen.2018.0919. PMC 6324417.
- Zhang, Y; Baik, SH; Zhou, L; Reynolds, CF; Lave, JR (2012). "Effects of Medicare Part D coverage gap on medication and medical treatment among elderly beneficiaries with depression". Arch Gen Psychiatry. 69: 672–9. doi:10.1001/archgenpsychiatry.2011.1402. PMC 3390754. PMID 22752233..

== Awards ==
Zhang has received multiple international awards including:

- Australian Research Council Australian Future Fellowship award 2021-2025
- Australian-American Health Policy Fellowship 2016-2017
- Excellence in Mental Health Policy and Economics Research Award 2009
- Hong Kong Hang Seng Bank Overseas Scholarship 1997 - 1999
- Thomas O. Pyle Fellow, Harvard Medical School 2006-2007
- Honors Convocations Award Recipient, University of Pittsburgh 2012, 2014, 2017
- Dean's Certificate for Research Excellence, University of Melbourne
