= World Psychiatric Association =

International association of psychiatric societies

- Association Mondiale de Psychiatrie (French)
- Abbreviation: WPA
- Predecessor: Association for the Organization of World Congresses of Psychiatry
- Formation: 1961; 65 years ago
- Type: NGO
- VAT ID no.: CHE-114.143.652
- Legal status: Swiss association
- Headquarters: WPA Secretariat
- Location: Psychiatric Hospital, 2, ch. du Petit-Bel-Air, Chêne-Bourg, Geneva, Switzerland
- Coordinates: 46.2061°N 6.2089°E
- Fields: Psychiatry
- Official language: English (working language)
- Secretary General: Saul Levin
- President: Danuta Wasserman
- President-Elect: Thomas G. Schulze
- Main organ: WPA General Assembly
- Publication: World Psychiatry
- Website: wpanet.org

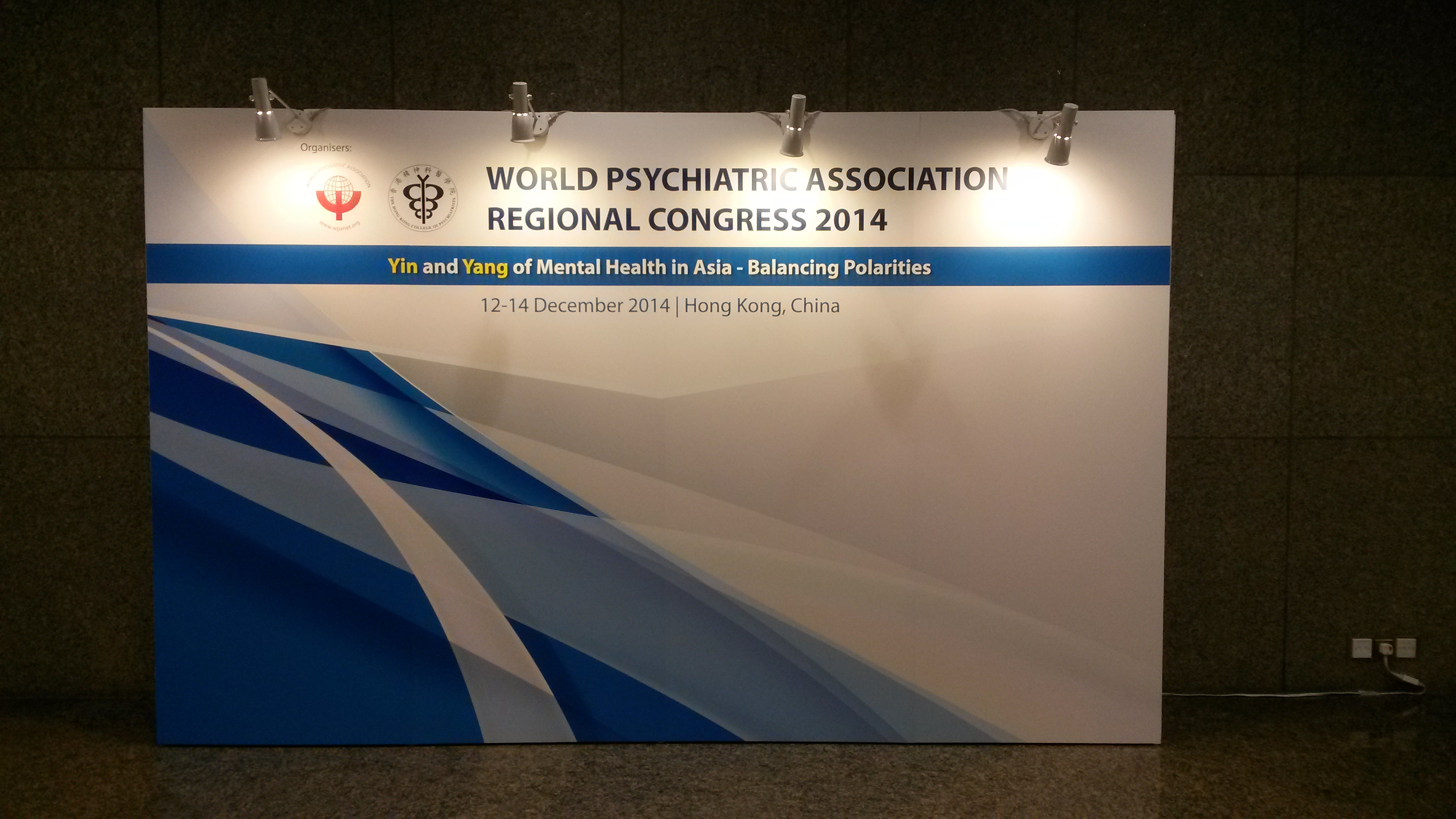
World Psychiatric Association regional congress 2014

The World Psychiatric Association (WPA) is a nongovernmental organization in official relations with the World Health Organization (WHO). It brings together 147 national psychiatric societies from 123 countries, representing more than 250,000 psychiatrists worldwide, and convenes the World Congress of Psychiatry.

== History ==
=== Origin and founding ===
The World Psychiatric Association traces its origins to the Association for the Organization of World Congresses of Psychiatry, which held its first world congress in Paris in 1950, followed by subsequent congresses in Zurich, Montreal, Madrid, Mexico City, Hawaii, Vienna, Athens, Rio de Janeiro and Hamburg.

Jean Delay was the first president of the Association for the Organization of World Congresses of Psychiatry when it was started in 1950. Donald Ewen Cameron became president of the World Psychiatric Association at its formal founding in 1961.

=== WPA and Soviet psychiatry ===
During the 1970s, the World Psychiatric Association became increasingly involved in the controversy over the political abuse of psychiatry in the Soviet Union. At its 1977 congress in Honolulu, the WPA General Assembly adopted a resolution submitted by the Royal College of Psychiatrists condemning "the systematic abuse of psychiatry for political purposes in the USSR". It also approved, by 122 votes to 66, an American Psychiatric Association proposal to establish a committee to monitor "the misuse of psychiatric skills, knowledge and facilities for the suppression of dissent wherever it occurs".

Relations between the WPA and the Soviet Union subsequently deteriorated. In February 1983, the Soviet All-Union Society of Neurologists and Psychiatrists (AUSNP) withdrew from the WPA while the association was considering its expulsion. The AUSNP remained outside the WPA until 1989, when it was conditionally readmitted following changes respect for human rights and extensive debate among WPA delegates. During the proceedings, the acting secretary of the Soviet delegation acknowledged that "previous political conditions in the U.S.S.R. created an environment in which psychiatric abuse occurred, including for nonmedical reasons."

== Structure and governance ==
World Congress locations and WPA leadership
Year	World Congress	President		Secretary General	
Year	World Congress	Name	Country	Name	Country
1950	Paris, France	Jean Delay	France	Henry Ey	France
1957	Zurich, Switzerland	Jean Delay	France	Henry Ey	France
1961	Montreal, Canada	D. Ewen Cameron	Canada	Henry Ey	France
1966	Madrid, Spain	Juan J. López-Ibor	Spain	Denis Leigh	U.K.
1972	Mexico City, Mexico	Howard Rome	USA	Denis Leigh	U.K.
1977	Hawaii, USA	Pierre Pichot	France	Peter Berner	Austria
1983	Vienna, Austria	Costas Stefanis	Greece	Fini Schulsinger	Denmark
1989	Athens, Greece	Jorge A. Costa e Silva	Brazil	Juan J. López-Ibor, Jr.	Spain
1993	Rio de Janeiro, Brazil	Felice Lieh-Mak	Hong Kong	Juan J. López-Ibor, Jr.	Spain
1996	Madrid, Spain	Norman Sartorius	Switzerland	Juan Mezzich	USA
1999	Hamburg, Germany	Juan J. López-Ibor, Jr.	Spain	Juan Mezzich	USA
2002	Yokohama, Japan	Ahmed Okasha	Egypt	John Cox	U.K.
2005	Cairo, Egypt	Juan Mezzich	USA	John Cox	U.K.
2008	Prague, Czech Republic	Mario Maj	Italy	Levent Kuey	Turkey
2011	Buenos Aires, Argentina	Pedro Ruiz	USA	Levent Kuey	Turkey
2014	Madrid, Spain	Dinesh Bhugra	U.K.	Roy Abraham Kallivayalil	India
2017	Berlin, Germany	Helen Herrman	Australia	Roy Abraham Kallivayalil	India
2018	Mexico City, Mexico	Helen Herrman	Australia	Roy Abraham Kallivayalil	India
2020	Virtual	Afzal Javed	UK	Petr Morozov (until 2022)	Russia
2023	Vienna, Austria	Danuta Wasserman	Sweden	Saul Levin	USA
2024	Mexico City, Mexico	Danuta Wasserman	Sweden	Saul Levin	USA
2025	Prague, Czech Republic	Danuta Wasserman	Sweden	Saul Levin	USA

As of October 2023, Danuta Wasserman is president, and Thomas G. Schulze is president-elect. The societies are clustered into 18 zones and four regions: the Americas, Europe, Africa & Middle East, and Asia & Australasia. Representatives of the societies constitute the World Psychiatric Association General Assembly, the governing body of the organization. The association also has individual members and there are provisions for affiliation of other associations (e.g., those dealing with a particular topic in psychiatry). There are 66 scientific sections.

== Objectives and goals ==
Originally created to produce world psychiatric congresses, it has evolved to hold regional meetings, to promote professional education and to set ethical, scientific and treatment standards for psychiatry.

== Publications ==
The official publication of the association is World Psychiatry. World Psychiatry and the association's official books are published by Wiley-Blackwell. WPA also self-publishes a quarterly newsletter on its website.

Several WPA scientific sections have their own official journals and newsletters:

Journals
Activitas Nervosa Superior (Psychiatric Electrophysiology Section)
Archives of Women's Mental Health (Women's Mental Health Section)
History of Psychiatry (History of Psychiatry Section)
Idee in Psichiatria (Ecology, Psychiatry and Mental Health Section)
International Journal of Mental Health (Psychiatric Rehabilitation Section)
Journal of Affective Disorders (Affective Disorders Section)
Journal of Intellectual Disability Research (Psychiatry of Intellectual Disability Section)
Journal of Mental Health Policy and Economics (Mental Health Economics Section)
Personality and Mental Health (Personality Disorders Section)
Psychiatry in General Practice (Rural Mental Health Section)
Psychopathology (Classification, Diagnostic Assessment and Nomenclature Section; Clinical Psychopathology Section)
Revista de Psicotrauma (Disaster Psychiatry Section)
Revue Francophone du Stress et du Trauma (Disaster Psychiatry Section)
Transcultural Psychiatry (Transcultural Psychiatry Section)
Newsletters
Art & Psychiatry Section (Section of the Psychopathology of Expression)
Child and Adolescent Psychiatry
Early Career Psychiatrists
Psyche and Spirit (Section on Religion, Spirituality and Psychiatry)
Psychological Consequences of Torture and Persecutions Section
Psychotherapy Section
World Healer (Transcultural Psychiatry Section)
WPA eReview (WPA Quarterly eNewsletter)

== Activities ==
The association has helped establish a code of professional ethics for psychiatrists. The association has also looked into charges regarding China's treatment of the Falun Gong.

== Bibliography ==
- Von Kelley, Lee; Fang, Jennifer (2013). Historical Dictionary of the World Health Organization. Scarecrow Press. doi:10.1176/pn.37.2.0021. ISBN 978-0-8108-7859-4.
- Saxena, Shekhar; Kane, Jeremy; Krawczyk, Noa; Bass, Judith K. (2019). "Mental Health Systems Around the World". Public Mental Health (2nd ed.). Oxford University Press. doi:10.1093/oso/9780190916602.001.0001. ISBN 978-0-19-091664-0.
- Kupersanin, Eve (18 January 2002). "World Psychiatric Association Prepares for 21st Century". Psychiatric News. 37 (2). doi:10.1176/pn.37.2.0021 – via Psychiatry Online.
- Fireside, Harvey (1979). Soviet Psychoprisons (1st ed.). New York: W. W. Norton & Company. ISBN 0-393-01266-2.

Canton, Helen; Hartley, Cathy; Holman, Catriona, eds. (2026). The Europa Directory of International Organizations 2026 (26th ed.). Taylor & Francis. ISBN 978-1-040-96350-0.
