= Suicide methods =

Means by which a person dies by suicide

Suicide methods are any means by which a person dies or attempts to die by suicide. Suicide attempts do not always result in death, and a non-fatal suicide attempt can leave the person with major physical injuries, long-term health problems, or brain damage.

Worldwide, three suicide methods predominate, with the pattern varying in different countries: these are hanging, pesticides, and firearms. Some suicides may be preventable by removing the means. Making common suicide methods less accessible leads to an overall reduction in the number of suicides.

Method-specific ways to do this might include restricting access to pesticides, firearms, and commonly used drugs. Other important measures are the introduction of policies that address the misuse of alcohol and the treatment of mental disorders. Gun-control measures in a number of countries have seen a reduction in suicides and other gun-related deaths. Other preventive measures are not method-specific; these include support, access to treatment, and calling a crisis hotline. There are multiple talk therapies that reduce suicidal thoughts and behaviors regardless of method, including dialectical behavior therapy (DBT).

== Purpose of study ==
The study of suicide methods aims to identify those commonly used, and the groups at risk of suicide; making methods less accessible may be useful in suicide prevention. Limiting the availability of means such as pesticides and firearms is recommended by a World Health Report on suicide and its prevention. The early identification of mental disorders and substance abuse disorders, follow-up care for those who have attempted suicide, and responsible reporting by the media are all seen to be key in reducing the number of deaths by suicide. National suicide prevention strategies are also advocated using a comprehensive and coordinated response to suicide prevention. This needs to include the registration and monitoring of suicides and attempted suicide, breaking figures down by age, sex, and method. ICD X-codes provide a way to capture detailed statistical data about suicide methods and demographics, but only about half of countries, representing significantly less than half of suicide deaths, have done this.

Such information allows public health resources to focus on the problems that are relevant in a particular place, or for a given population or subpopulation. For instance, if firearms are used in a significant number of suicides in one place, then public health policies there could focus on gun safety, such as keeping guns locked away, and the key inaccessible to at-risk family members. If young people are found to be at increased risk of suicide by overdosing on particular medications, then an alternative class of medication may be prescribed instead, a safety plan and monitoring of medication can be put in place, and parents can be educated about how to prevent the hoarding of medication for a future suicide attempt.

== Media reporting ==
When news organizations report on suicide-related events, media guidelines encourage them to provide information about local suicide crisis phone numbers, such as this number for North America.

Media reporting of the methods used in any given suicide is "strongly discouraged" by the World Health Organization, government health agencies, universities, and the Associated Press among others. Detailed descriptions of suicides or the personal characteristics of the person who died contribute to copycat suicides (suicide contagion). Dramatic or inappropriate descriptions of individual suicides by mass media has been linked specifically to copycat suicides among teenagers. Writing for The New Yorker about celebrity suicides, Andrew Solomon wrote that "You who are reading this are at statistically increased risk of suicide right now." In one study, changes in how news outlets reported suicide reduced suicides by a particular method.

Media reporting guidelines also apply to "online content including citizen-generated media coverage". The Recommendations for Reporting on Suicide, created by journalists, suicide prevention groups, and internet safety non-profit organizations, encourage linking to resources such as a list of suicide crisis lines and information about risk factors for suicide, and reporting on suicide as a multi-faceted, treatable health issue.

== Method restriction ==
Method restriction, also called lethal means reduction, is an effective way to reduce the number of suicide deaths in the short and medium term. Method restriction is considered a best practice supported by "compelling" evidence. Some of these actions, such as installing barriers on bridges and reducing the toxicity in gas, require action by governments, industries, or public utilities. At the individual level, method restriction can be as simple as asking a trusted friend or family member to store firearms until the crisis has passed. According to Danuta Wasserman, professor in psychiatry and suicidology at Karolinska Institute, choosing not to restrict access to suicide methods is unethical.

Method restriction is effective and prevents suicides. It has the largest effect on overall suicide rates when the method being restricted is common and no direct substitution is available. If the method being restricted is uncommon, or if a substitute is readily available, then it may be effective in individual cases but not produce a large-scale reduction in the number of deaths in a country.

Method substitution is the process of choosing a different suicide method when the first-choice method is inaccessible. In many cases, when the first-choice method is restricted, the person does not attempt to find a substitute. Method substitution has been measured over the course of decades, so when a common method is restricted (for example, by making domestic gas less toxic), overall suicide rates may be suppressed for many years. If the first-choice suicide method is inaccessible, a method substitution may be made which may be less lethal, tending to result in fewer fatal suicide attempts.

In an example of the curb cut effect, changes unrelated to suicide have also functioned as suicide method restrictions. Examples of this include changes to align train doors with platforms, switching from coal gas to natural gas in homes, and gun control laws, all of which have reduced suicides despite being intended for a different purpose.

== List ==
=== Suffocation-related methods ===
As a classification of suicide methods, suffocation, strangulation, and hanging are often grouped together.

In the UK, hanging, suffocation, or strangulation (which are treated as a single category in national statistics) is the most common suicide method. In 2024, about 57% of UK suicides used one of these forms, representing an increase from 40% in 2001.

==== Hanging ====
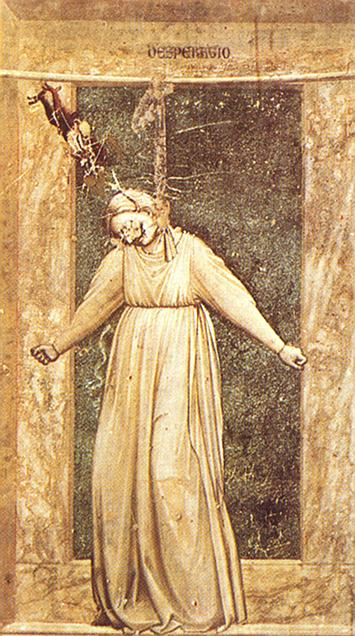
14th century fresco by Giotto, depicting suicide by hanging

Hanging is a common method of suicide. In high-income countries other than the US, hanging is the most common suicide method. Hanging is also a prevalent means of suicide in impoverished pre-industrial societies, and is more common in rural areas than in urban areas. In some countries, this method is particularly common. For example, hanging represents about 90% of suicide deaths in Poland and 70% of suicide deaths in both Japan and Mexico.

Hanging involves the use of a ligature such as a rope or cord attached to an anchor point with the other end used to form a noose placed around the neck. The cause of death will either be due to strangulation or a broken neck. About half of attempted suicides by hanging result in death. People who favor this method are usually unaware that it is often a "slow, painful, and messy method that [needs] technical knowledge".

Method-specific restriction is difficult because the means are readily available. In controlled settings such as a jail, the risk of hanging can be reduced by providing an at-risk person with an anti-suicide smock or thin disposable clothing instead of ordinary clothes and tear-resistant blankets.

Hanging was the most common method in traditional Chinese culture, as it was believed that the rage involved in such a death permitted the person's spirit to haunt and torment survivors. In the Chinese culture, suicide by hanging was used as an act of revenge by women and of defiance by powerless officials, who used it as a "final, but unequivocal, way of standing still against and above oppressive authorities". Chinese people would often approach the act ceremonially, including the use of proper attire.

==== Drowning ====
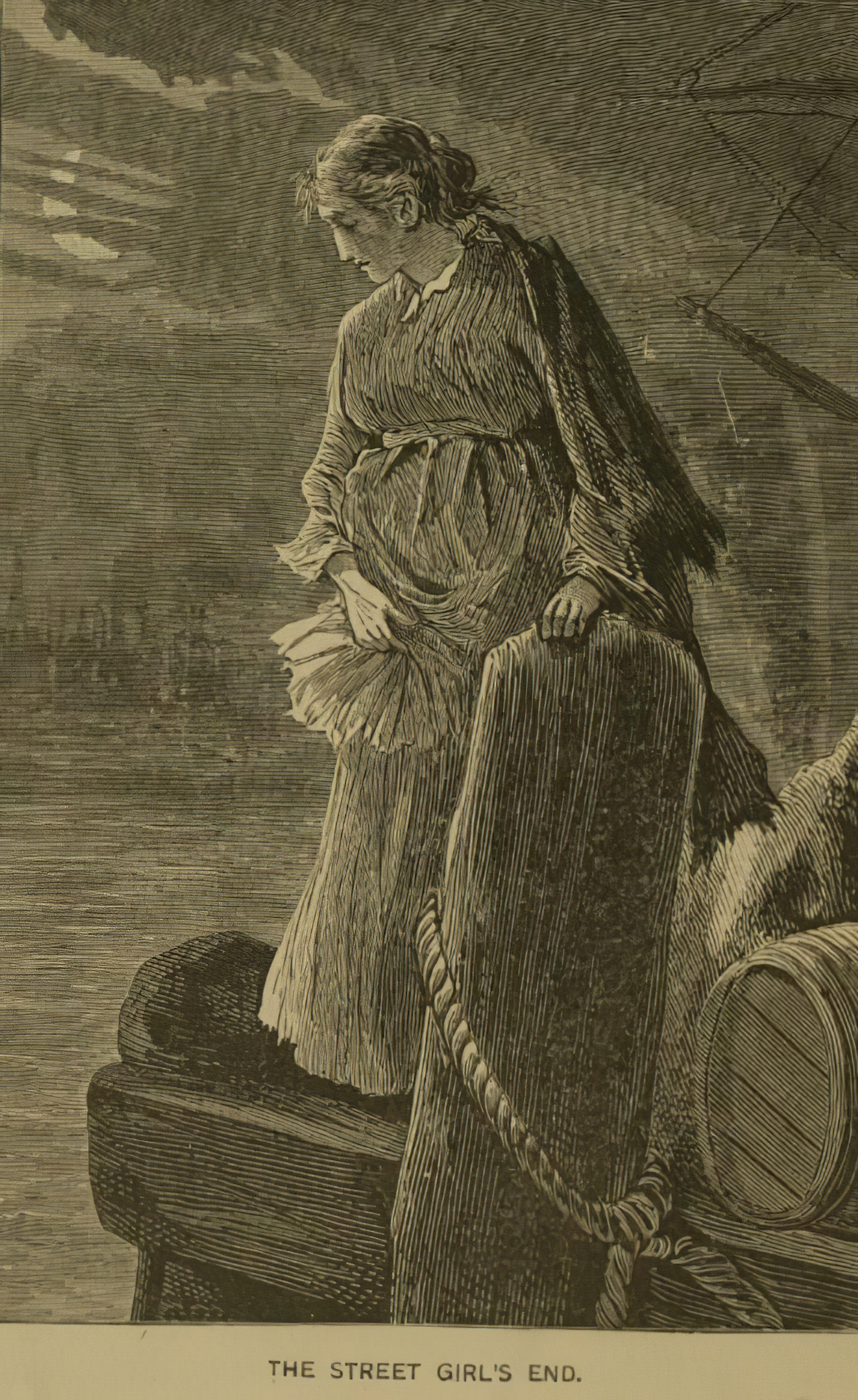
1884 illustration of a homeless girl contemplating drowning herself

Suicide by drowning is the act of deliberately submerging oneself in water or other liquid to prevent breathing. It accounts for less than 2% of all suicides in the United States. People with dementia and schizophrenia have a higher risk of dying by drowning. Of those who attempt suicide by drowning in the US, about half die.

About 2% to 3% of suicides by drowning involve deliberately driving a vehicle into a body of water.

==== Suffocation ====
Suicide by suffocation involves restricting breathing or the amount of oxygen taken in, causing asphyxia and eventually hypoxia. It is not possible to die simply by holding the breath for an extended period of time, since an involuntary reflex causes the respiratory muscles to contract, forcing an in-breath, and the re-establishment of a normal breathing rhythm. Therefore, inhaling an inert gas such as helium or nitrogen, or a toxic gas such as carbon monoxide, is used to bring about unconsciousness. Certain devices such as exit bags are designed to be used with this method, and provide a way for the carbon dioxide to passively escape, which prevents the panic, sense of suffocation and struggling before unconsciousness, known as the hypercapnic alarm response caused by the presence of high carbon dioxide concentrations in the blood. As of 2010, organizations supporting a right to die promoted death by helium inhalation, although most cases using this method in the US were people with psychiatric conditions.

=== Poisoning ===
Suicide by poisoning, also called self-poisoning, is usually classed as a drug overdose when drugs such as painkillers or recreational drugs are used. The use of pesticides to self-poison is the most common method used in many lower and middle-income countries, and one of the most common methods worldwide. Poisoning through the means of toxic plants is usually slow and painful. Method restriction, such as by limiting the amount of a substance that can be bought at once, or requiring that pesticides be stored securely, is a feasible and effective way to reduce suicide by pesticide poisoning.

As of 2006, worldwide, around 30% of suicides were from pesticide poisonings. It was the leading suicide method in developing countries, with about half of suicide deaths in India involving poisoning, and most of those involving pesticides. In the UK (England and Wales), poisoning accounted for about 21% of suicide deaths in 2024, representing a decrease from 34% of suicide deaths in 2001. In the UK in 2019, 32% of suicide poisoning was the most common suicide method for females, compared to 49% in 2001. In the UK in 2019, 16% of UK suicide deaths in males were due to poisoning, compared to 29% in 2001.

Self-poisoning accounts for the highest number of non-fatal suicide attempts. In the United States about 60% of suicide attempts and 14% of suicide deaths involve drug overdoses. The risk of death in suicide attempts involving overdose is about 2%. Overdose attempts using painkillers are among the most common, due to their easy availability over-the-counter.

A particular type of poisoning involves the inhalation of high levels of carbon monoxide (CO). Death usually occurs through hypoxia. A nonfatal attempt can result in memory loss and other symptoms.

=== Firearm ===
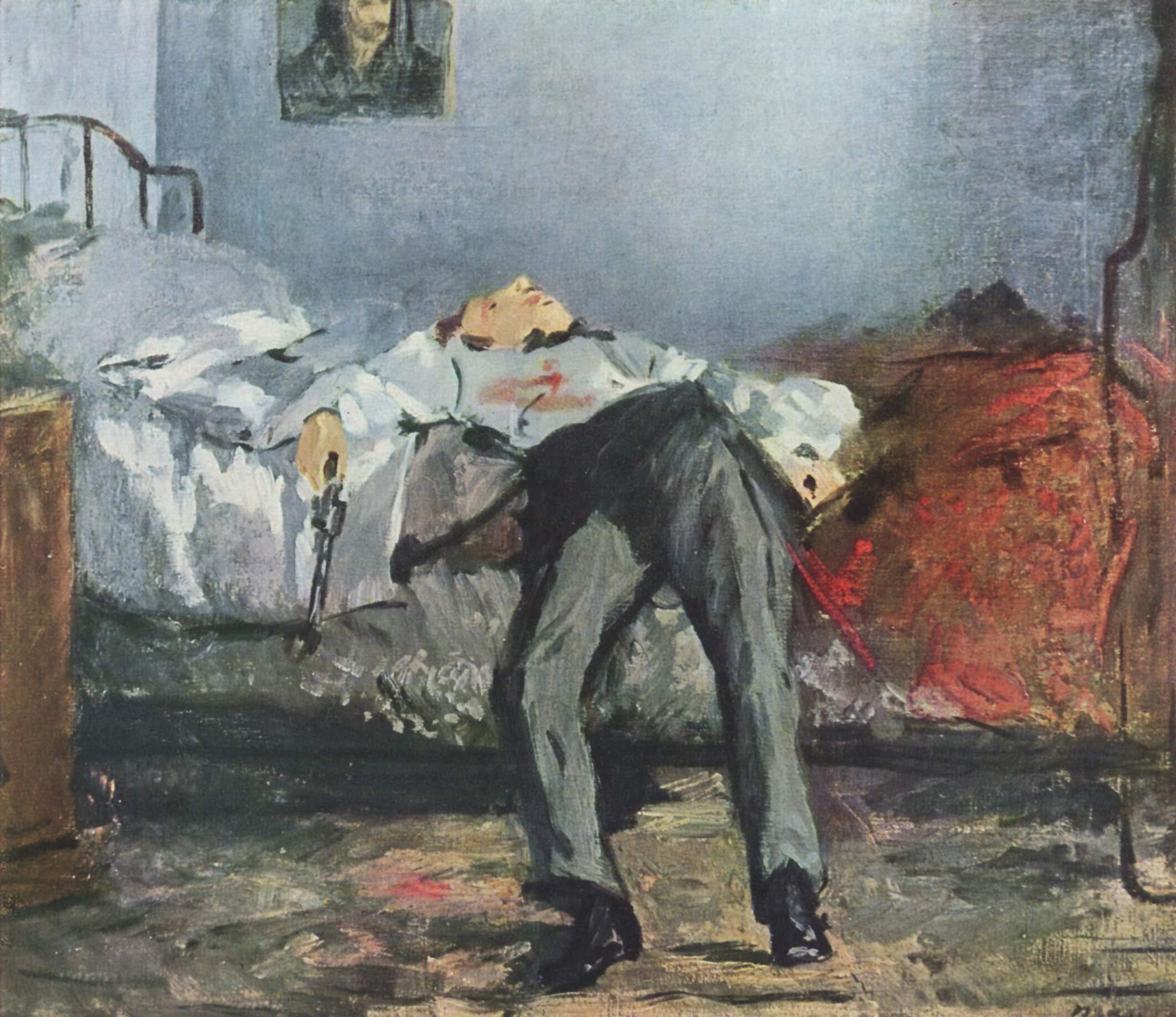
Le Suicidé (The Suicide) by Édouard Manet, depicting suicide by firearm

In the United States, suicide by firearm is the most lethal method of suicide, resulting in a fatality 90% of the time, and is thus the leading cause of death by suicide as of 2017. Worldwide, firearm prevalence in suicides varies widely, depending on the acceptance and availability of firearms in a culture. The use of firearms in suicides ranges from less than 10% in Australia, to 50.5% in the U.S., where it is the most common method of suicide.

Reducing access to guns at a population level decreases the risk of suicide by firearms. Fewer people die from suicide overall in places with stricter laws regulating the use, purchase, and trading of firearms.

=== Jumping ===
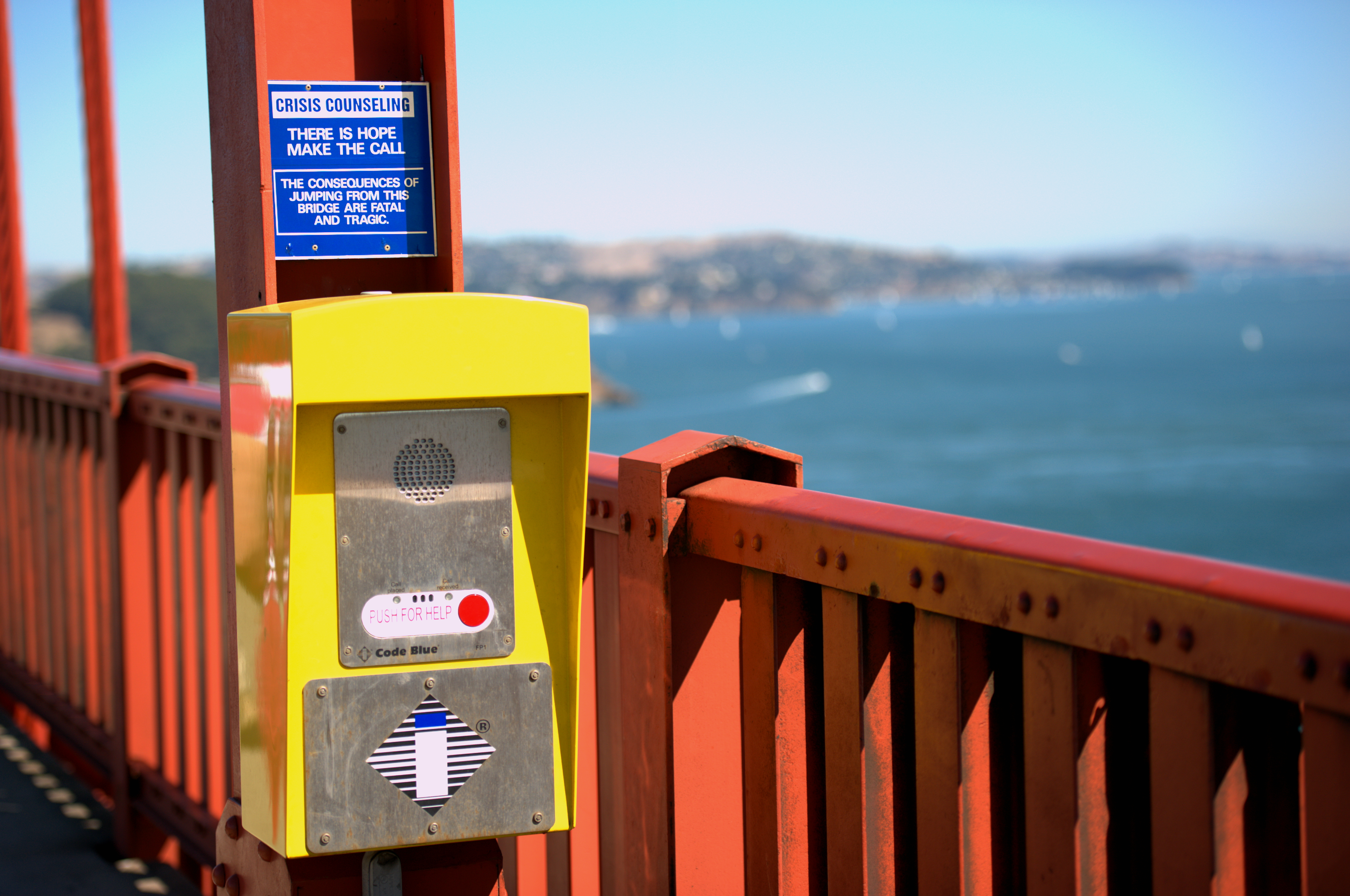
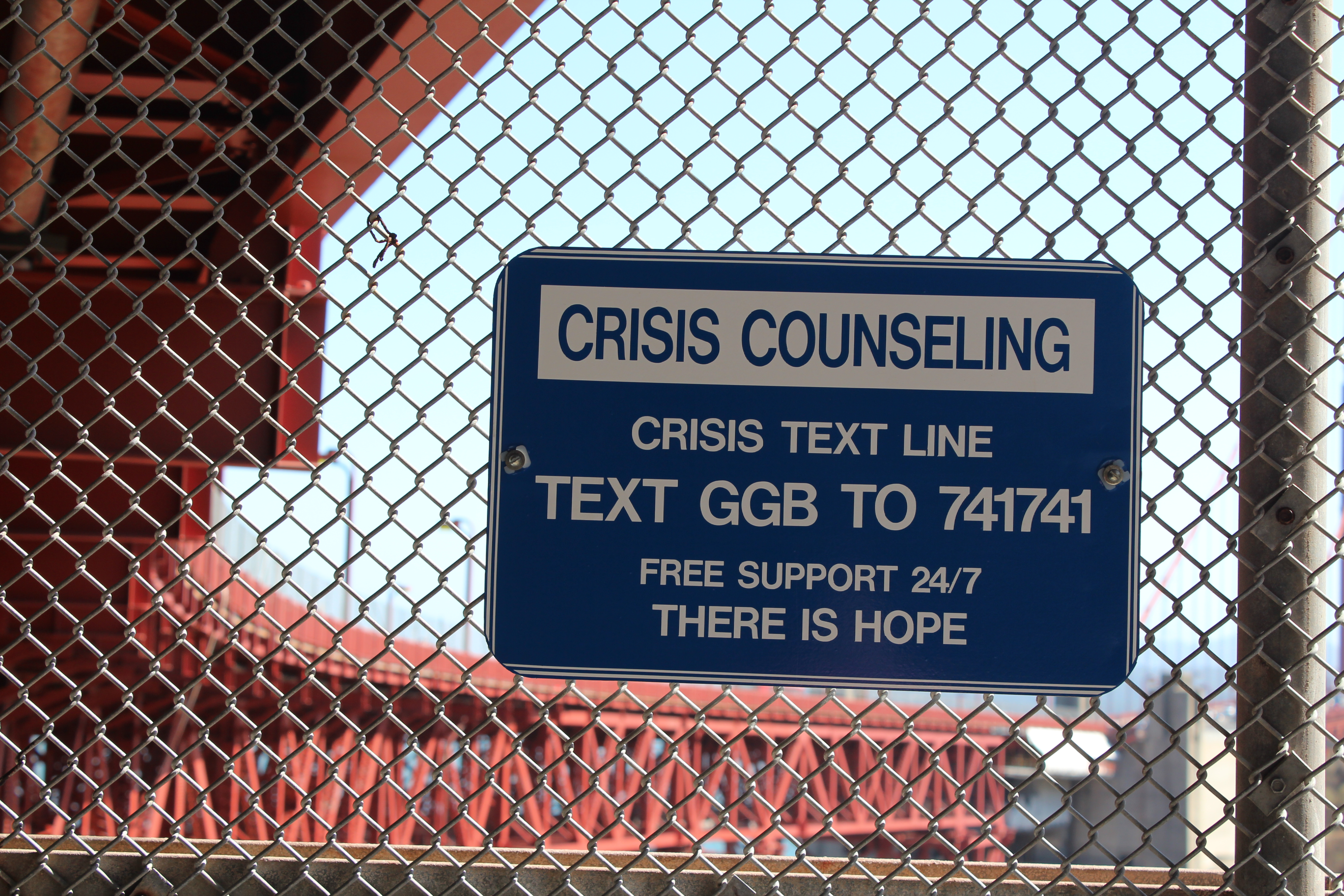
As a suicide prevention initiative, signs on the Golden Gate Bridge promote special telephones that connect to a crisis hotline, as well as a 24/7 crisis text line.

Jumping is the most common method of suicide in Hong Kong, accounting for 52.1% of all reported suicide cases in 2006 and similar rates for the years before that. The Centre for Suicide Research and Prevention of the University of Hong Kong believes that it may be due to the abundance of easily accessible high-rise buildings in Hong Kong. In the United States, jumping is among the least common methods of suicide (less than 2% of all reported suicides in 2005). Between 1937 and 2012, there were around 2,000 suicides at the Golden Gate Bridge. Jumping deaths are often impulsive, and one study of the Golden Gate Bridge demonstrated that more than 90% of people interrupted in a suicide attempt ultimately died by natural or accidental causes, with only 6% dying in a subsequent suicide attempt.

Many jumping deaths could be prevented through the construction of fencing or other safety equipment. For example, suicide by jumping into a volcanic crater is a rare method of suicide. Mount Mihara in Japan briefly became a notorious suicide site during the Great Depression following media reports of a suicide there. Copycat suicides in the ensuing years prompted the erection of a protective fence surrounding the crater. Similarly, in New Zealand, secure fencing at the Grafton Bridge substantially reduced the rate of suicides. Chest-high barriers are more effective than waist-high barriers because they require more time and effort to climb over.

Constructing barriers is not the only option, and it can be expensive. Other method-specific prevention actions include making staff members visible in high-risk areas, using closed-circuit television cameras to identify people in inappropriate places or behaving abnormally (e.g., lingering in a place that people normally spend little time in), and installing awnings and soft-looking landscaping, which deters suicide attempts by making the place look ineffective.

Another factor in reducing jumping deaths is to avoid suggesting in news articles, signs, or other communication that a high-risk place is a common, appropriate, or effective place for dying by jumping from. The efficacy of signage is uncertain, and may depend on whether the wording is simple and appropriate.

=== Cutting and stabbing ===
A fatal self-inflicted wound to the wrist is termed a deep wrist injury, and is often preceded by several tentative surface-breaking attempts known as hesitation wounds, indicating indecision or a self-harm tactic. For every suicide by wrist cutting, there are many more nonfatal attempts, so that the number of actual deaths using this method is very low.

Wounds from suicide attempts involve the non-dominant hand, with damage often done to the median nerve, ulnar nerve, radial artery, palmaris longus muscle, and flexor carpi radialis muscle. Such injuries can severely affect the function of the hand, and the inability caused to carry out work or interests increases the risk of further attempts.

Seppuku is a form of Japanese ritual suicide by disembowelment. While reserved for samurai in their code of honour, a feminine counterpart of female ritual suicide also exists (sometimes incorrectly referred to in western understanding as jigai), which involves cutting the jugular vein. While seppuku requires the assistance of another samurai, jigai can be performed on the self. Seppuku is painful and slow - neither method is common in the modern day.

=== Starvation and dehydration ===
A classification has been made of Voluntarily Stopping Eating and Drinking (VSED) which is often resorted to by those with a terminal illness. This includes fasting and dehydration, and has also been referred to as autoeuthanasia. It has been used by assisted dying activists, such as Wendy Mitchell, as a means of death in places where assisted suicide is not available.

==== Starvation ====
Fasting to death has been used by Hindu, Buddhist, and Jain ascetics and householders, as a ritual method of suicide known as "prayopavesa" in Hinduism, Vatakkiruttal in Tamil tradition, "sokushinbutsu" historically in Buddhism, and as "sallekhana" in Jainism. Cathars also fasted to death after receiving the consolamentum sacrament, in order to die while in a morally perfect state. The method is also used in passive senicide and associated with the political protest of the hunger strike such as the 1981 Irish hunger strike in which ten prisoners died.

==== Dehydration ====
Death from dehydration can take from several days to a few weeks. This means that unlike many other suicide methods, it cannot be accomplished impulsively. Those who die by terminal dehydration typically lapse into unconsciousness before death, and may also experience delirium and deranged serum sodium.

Terminal dehydration has been described as having substantial advantages over physician-assisted suicide with respect to self-determination, access, professional integrity, and social implications. Specifically, a patient has a right to refuse treatment and it would be a personal assault for someone to force water on a patient, but such is not the case if a doctor merely refuses to provide lethal medication. But it also has distinctive drawbacks as a humane means of voluntary death. One survey of hospice nurses found that nearly twice as many had cared for patients who chose voluntary refusal of food and fluids to hasten death as had cared for patients who chose physician-assisted suicide. They also rated fasting and dehydration as causing less suffering and pain and being more peaceful than physician-assisted suicide. Other sources note very painful side effects of dehydration, including seizures, skin cracking and bleeding, blindness, nausea, vomiting, cramping and severe headaches.

=== Collision with or of a vehicle ===
Another suicide method is to lie down, or throw oneself, in the path of a fast-moving vehicle, either on the road or onto railway tracks. Nonfatal attempts may result in profound injuries, such as multiple bone fractures, amputations, concussion and severe mental and physical handicapping.

==== Road ====
Some people use intentional car crashes as a suicide method. This especially applies to single-occupant, single-vehicle wrecks, although some suicidal drivers cause head-on collisions. Even single-vehicle collisions may harm other road users; for example, a driver who brakes abruptly or swerves to avoid a suicidal person may collide with something else on the road, resulting in harm to the driver or others. Both the innocent driver and bystanders may be traumatized by the experience, even if everyone survives. Being victimized by a suicidal pedestrian is recognized as an occupational hazard for professional drivers, especially if they operate heavy vehicles.

The real percentage of suicides among motor vehicle fatalities is not reliably known and likely varies by the ease of accessing a car and the ease of accessing other methods. Suicidal intent is often inferred from the circumstances, such as the driver being alone in the vehicle, driving at a high speed, without normal use of a seat belt, under circumstances that do not normally result in fatal wrecks (e.g., a straight road and good weather conditions). Somewhere between 1% and 10% of all crashes (fatal and non-fatal combined) likely result from suicidal intent. In addition to a vehicle being used as a method (e.g., deliberately causing a wreck), a vehicle may be the location of a suicide attempt using another method (e.g., while the suicidal person is inside a parked car).

People who attempt vehicular suicide or murder–suicides tend to be adult men who recently experienced a stressful event. They tend to be impulsive, to have previously attempted suicide, and to have a history of reckless driving. Suicidal drivers are unlikely to be drunk at the time, though in the case of vehicle–pedestrian collisions, it may be difficult to determine whether an intoxicated pedestrian had suicidal intent or was non-suicidal but was so drunk as to be unable to recognize and respond to a dangerous situation.

==== Rail ====
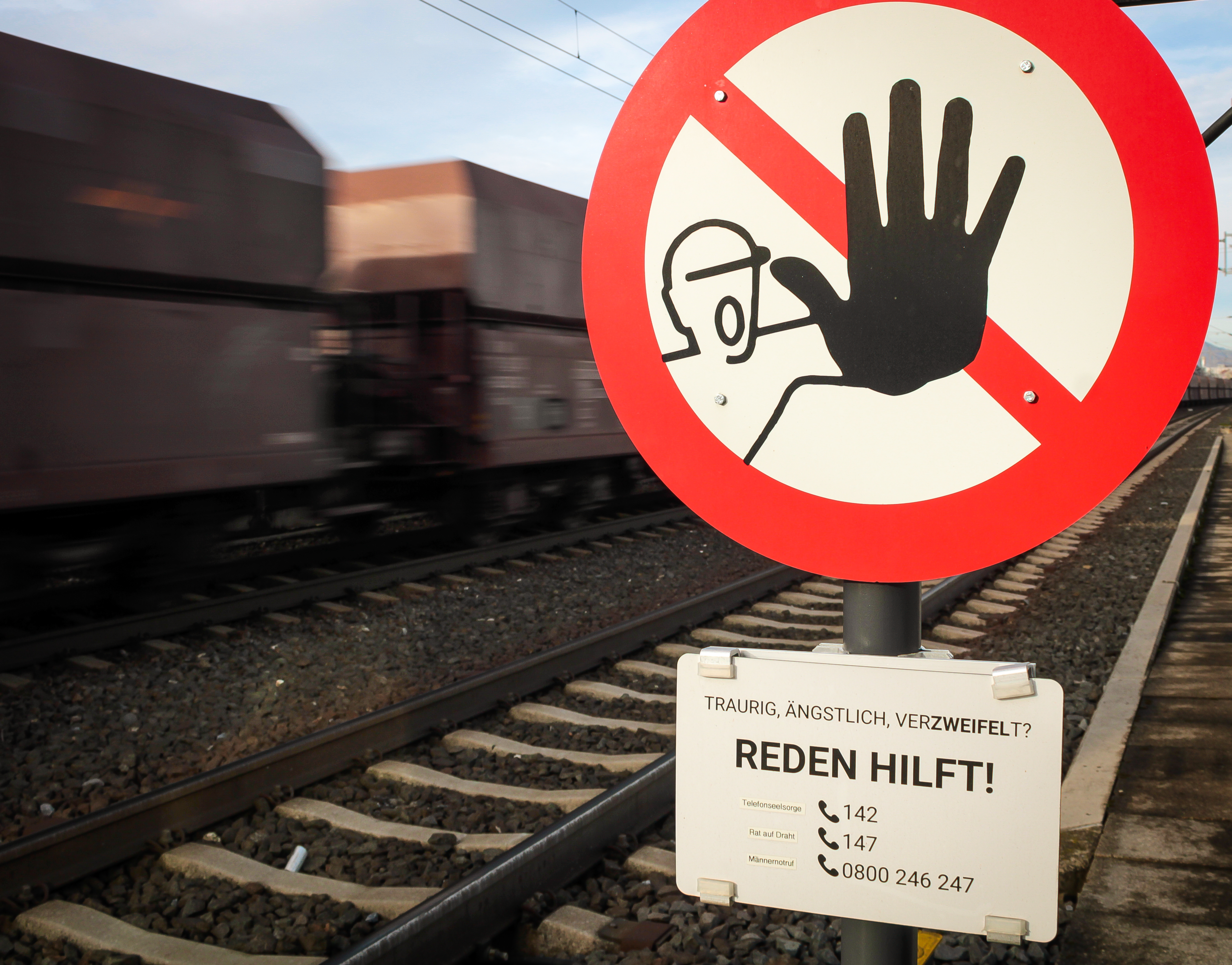
A suicide prevention sign by a railway

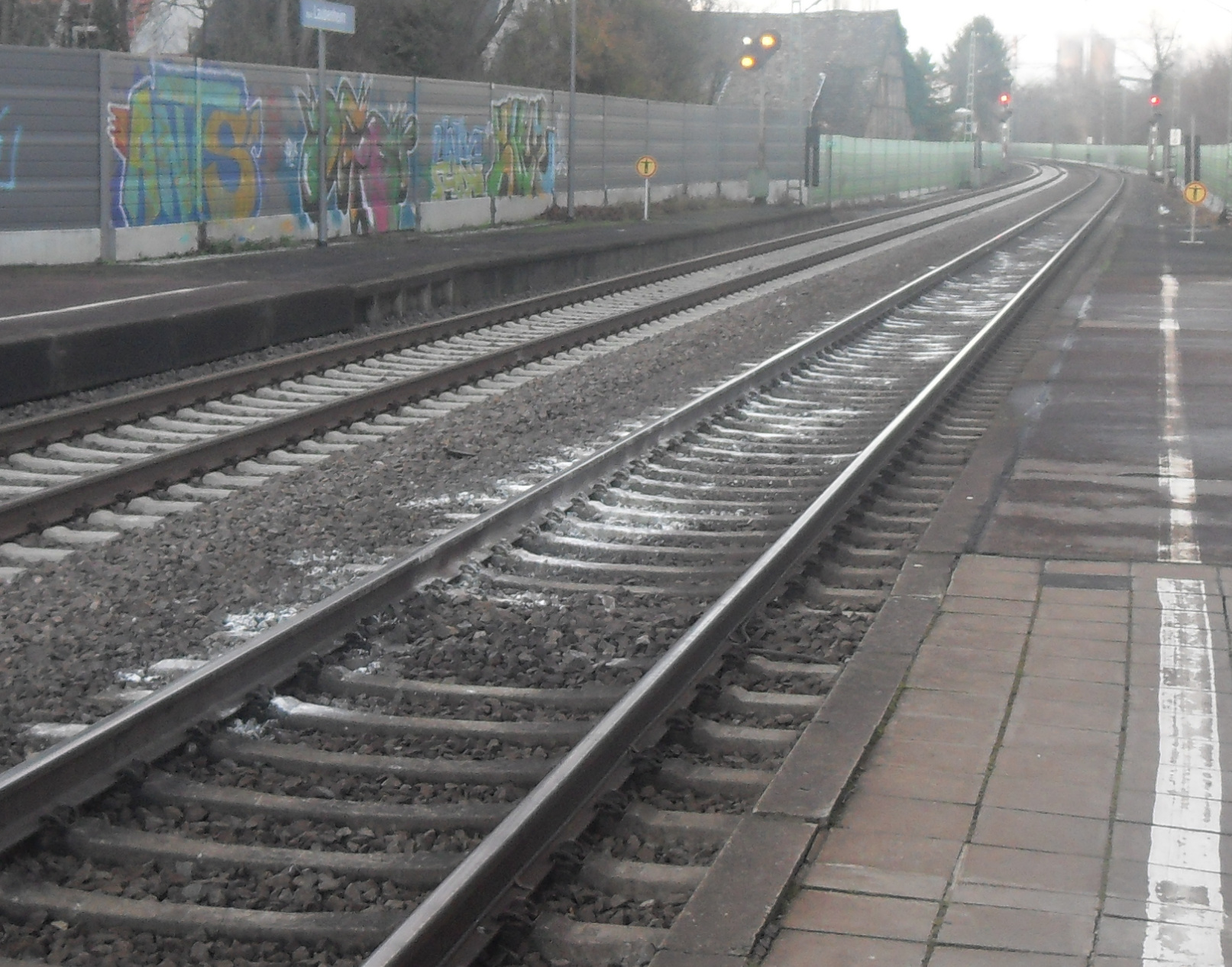
Lime on rails being used as a disinfectant after a suicide at Mainz-Laubenheim, Germany

Rail suicide, or suicide by train, is deliberate self-harm resulting in death by means of impact from a moving rail vehicle. The suicide occurs when an approaching train hits a suicidal pedestrian jumping onto, lying down on, or walking or standing on the tracks. Low friction on the tracks usually makes it impossible for the train to stop quickly enough. On urban mass transit rail systems that use a high-voltage electrified third rail, the suicide may also touch or be otherwise drawn into contact with it, adding electrocution to the cause of death.

Unlike other methods, rail suicide often directly affects the general public. Trains must be temporarily rerouted and diverted to clean the tracks and investigate the incident, causing delays for passengers and crews that may extend far beyond the site, a costly economic inconvenience. Train drivers in particular, effectively forced into being accomplices to the suicide they witness, often suffer post-traumatic stress disorder that adversely affects their personal lives and careers. In recent years railways and their unions have been offering more support to afflicted drivers.

Research into the demographics of rail suicide has shown that most are male and have diagnosed mental illness, to a greater extent than suicides in general. The correlation of rail suicide and mental illness has led to some sites along rail lines near mental hospitals becoming rail suicide hotspots; some researchers have recommended that no such facilities be located within walking distance of stations. Within the developed world, the Netherlands and Germany have high rates of rail suicide while the U.S. and Canada have the lowest rates. While suicides on urban mass transit usually take place at stations, on conventional rail systems they are generally split almost evenly between stations, level crossings and the open stretches of track between them.

Prevention efforts have generally focused on suicide in general, on the grounds that not much can be done at tracks themselves, since suicidal individuals are believed to be determined enough to overcome most efforts to keep them from the tracks. Rail-specific means of prevention have included platform screen doors, which has been highly successful at reducing suicide on some urban mass transit systems, calming lights and ambient music, and putting signs with suicide hotline numbers at sites likely to be used. Some rail networks have also trained their staff to watch, either in person or remotely, for behavioural indicators of a possible suicide attempt and intervene before it happens. Media organisations have also been advised to be circumspect in reporting some details of a rail suicide in order to avoid copycat suicides, such as those that happened after German football goalkeeper Robert Enke took his own life on the tracks in 2009, a suicide widely covered in European media.

==== Air ====
Toward the end of the 20th century, one or two pilots in the US died by suicide by aircraft each year. The pilot was usually flying alone at the time, and was using alcohol or drugs about half the time. In the rare case of a pilot engaging in murder–suicide, the number of innocent people is sometimes very high. On 24 March 2015, a Germanwings co-pilot deliberately crashed Germanwings Flight 9525 into the French Alps to kill himself, killing 149 people with him. Suicide by pilot has also been proposed as a potential cause for the disappearance and following destruction of Malaysian Airlines Flight 370 in 2014, with supporting evidence being found in a flight simulator application used by the flight's pilot.

=== Disease ===
There have been documented cases of gay men deliberately trying to contract a disease such as HIV/AIDS as a means of suicide.

=== Electrocution ===
Suicide by electrocution involves using a lethal electric shock, and is a rarely used method. This causes arrhythmias of the heart, meaning that the heart does not contract in synchrony between the different chambers, essentially causing elimination of blood flow. Furthermore, depending on the current, burns may also occur.

=== Fire ===
Self-immolation is suicide usually by fire. This method of suicide is rare due to it being long and painful. If the attempt is intervened, severe burns and scar tissue will prevail with subsequent emotional impact.

It has been used as a protest tactic, by Thích Quảng Đức in 1963 to protest the South Vietnam's anti-Buddhist policies; by Malachi Ritscher in 2006 to protest the United States' involvement in the Iraq War; by Mohamed Bouazizi in 2011 in Tunisia which gave rise to the Tunisian Revolution; by Aaron Bushnell in 2024 to protest the United States' support for Israel in the Israel–Hamas war; and historically as a ritual known as sati where a Hindu widow would immolate herself in her husband's funeral pyre.

=== Hypothermia ===
Hypothermia is a rare method of suicide. Between 1991 and 2014 in the United States, there were eight cases in the scientific literature, and they usually involved some other factor like drugs.

=== Indirect ===
Indirect suicide is the act of setting out on an obviously fatal course without directly carrying out the act upon oneself. Indirect suicide is differentiated from legally defined suicide by the fact that the person does not directly cause the action meant to kill them, but rather expects and allows the action to happen to them. Examples of indirect suicide include a soldier enlisting in the army with the intention and expectation of being killed in combat, or provoking an armed law enforcement officer into using lethal force against them. The latter is generally called "suicide by cop".

Evidence exists for suicide by capital crime in colonial Australia. Convicts seeking to escape their brutal treatment would murder another individual. This was felt necessary due to a religious taboo against direct suicide. A person committing suicide was believed to be destined for hell, whereas a person committing murder could be absolved of their sins before execution. In its most extreme form, groups of prisoners on the extremely brutal penal colony of Norfolk Island would form suicide lotteries. Prisoners would draw straws with one prisoner murdering another. The remaining participants would witness the crime, and would be sent away to Sydney, as capital trials could not be held on Norfolk Island, thus earning a break from the Island. There is uncertainty as to the extent of suicide lotteries. While surviving contemporary accounts claim that the practice was common, such claims are probably exaggerated.

=== Rituals ===
Ritual suicide is performed in a specifically prescribed way, often as part of a cultural or religious practice. Suicide by hanging was traditionally practiced in China and the Sinosphere as a means of ensuring that one's ghost would be able to haunt and torment the powerful but unjust. Self-immolation was practiced similarly in India and spread with Dharmic religions. Some forms of suicide involve or are understood as martyrdom and are undertaken ritualistically. Sallekhana is the practice of ritualized starvation following Jain practices. Romans who considered themselves dishonored would "fall on their sword", ritualistically transfixing themselves on their swords; the similar medieval Japanese practice became known as seppuku or harakiri for samurai. Female ritual suicide (incorrectly referred to in some English sources as jigai) was carried out in Japan by wives of samurai who had committed seppuku or otherwise brought dishonour.

== See also ==
- Advocacy of suicide
- List of suicides from antiquity to the present
  - List of suicides (A–M)
  - List of suicides (N–Z)
- List of suicides in the 21st century
- Sarco device – Euthanasia device using inert gas
- Suicide bag – Euthanasia device using inert gas
- Suicide legislation – Laws concerning suicide around the world
