= Juan Mezzich =

Juan E. Mezzich (born 1945) was the president of the World Psychiatric Association (WPA) from 2005 to 2008. He currently works as the Professor of Psychiatry and Director at the Division of Psychiatric Epidemiology and International Center for Mental Health at the Mount Sinai School of Medicine, New York University.

During his life he was awarded the Simón Bolivar Award of the American Psychiatric Association, Doctor Honoris Causal at Athens University (Greece), Cordoba University (Argentina), and University of Cluj-Napoca (Romania). He also received an Honorary Professorship at Cayetano Heredia Peruvian University and the University of Belgrade.

Mezzich is author/coauthor of over 200 scientific journal articles and book chapters and wrote more than 20 books and monographs and is the Editor/coeditor of Psychopathology, Basel, and Psiquiatría y Salud Integral, New York. He is also an editorial board member of 12 other psychiatric journals in the Americas and Europe.

== Biography ==
Mezzich was born in 1945, in Lima, Perú, of Yugoslavian and Peruvian ancestries.

He graduated at the Cayetano Heredia Peruvian University and was the president of the University Student Association. He received psychiatric residency training at Ohio State University and was the diplomate of the American Board of Psychiatry and Neurology, and has a Ph.D. in Mathematical and Statistical Psychology at the Ohio State University.

From 1996 to 1999 he was the Secretary General of the WPA. From 2005 to 2008 he was the president of the WPA.

== Currently researching ==
Currently Mezzich is researching on:

- New International Classification and Diagnostic Systems (ICD-11 and Comprehensive Diagnostic Model)
- Mental and General Health Comorbidity
- Culture-Informed Assessment of Mental Health (Multi-ethnic Bicultural Scale, Personal Health Scale, and Quality of Life Index)
- DSM-IV Cultural Formulation (educational developments and research evaluation of its impact on clinical care).

== Books written by Juan Mezzich ==
- Psychiatry and Sexual Health: An Integrative Approach (2006)
- Philosophical & Methodological Bases of Psychiatric Diagnosis
- Comprehensive Health & Integration of Services: New York & International Perspectives
- Guía Latinoamericana de Diagnóstico Psiquiátrico (GLADP) (APAL, 2004)
- Personality Disorders (2004)
- WPA International Guidelines for Diagnostic Assessment (IGDA) (2003)
- International Classification and Diagnosis: Critical Experience and Future Directions (2002)
- Cultural Psychiatry: International Perspectives (2001)
- The City and Mental Health (2000), Culture and Psychiatric Diagnosis: A DSM-IV Perspective (1996)
- Psychiatric Diagnosis: A World Perspective (1995)
- Psychiatric Epidemiology (1994)
- The 1986-1987 initial evaluation summary report (1988)

Academic offices
Preceded by Ahmed Okasha	President of World Psychiatric Association; 2005–2008	Succeeded by Mario Maj
