= World Psychiatry =

- Discipline: Psychiatry
- Language: Arabic, Chinese, English, French, Russian, Spanish, Turkish
- Edited by: Mario Maj

Publication details
- History: 2002–present
- Publisher: Wiley-Blackwell on behalf of the World Psychiatric Association
- Frequency: Triannual
- Impact factor: 73.3 (2022)

Standard abbreviations
- ISO 4: World Psychiatry

Indexing
- ISSN: 1723-8617
- OCLC no.: 70203966

Links
- Journal homepage; Online access; Online archives

World Psychiatry is a medical journal covering research in the area of psychiatry. It is the official publication of the World Psychiatric Association. It is published by Wiley-Blackwell and the editor-in-chief is Mario Maj.

== Abstracting and indexing ==
According to the Journal Citation Reports, the journal has a 2022 impact factor of 73.3. It is ranked no. 1 out of 155 journals in the category Psychiatry and no. 1 out of 144 journals in the Social Sciences Citation Index category.

The journal is abstracted and indexed in PubMed, Current Contents/Clinical Medicine, Current Contents/Social and Behavioral Sciences, Science Citation Index Expanded, and Embase.

In addition to the English edition, the journal is also available in Arabic, Chinese, French, Russian, Spanish and Turkish.

== See also ==
- List of psychiatry journals
