= Jorge Alberto Costa e Silva =

Brazilian psychiatrist (born 1942)

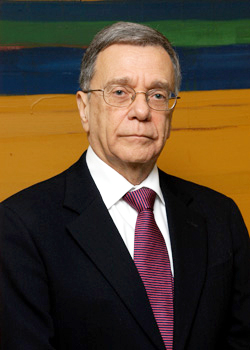
Jorge Alberto Costa e Silva

Jorge Alberto Costa e Silva (born 26 March 1942 in Vassouras) is a Brazilian psychiatrist.

He graduated from the Faculty of Medical Sciences of the State University of Rio de Janeiro in 1966.

He began his career as Assistant Professor of Psychiatry at the Faculty of Medicine of the State University of Rio de Janeiro where he became Full Professor in 1979.

From 1989 to 1992, he was president of the World Psychiatric Association.
