= The Journal of Mental Health Policy and Economics =

- Discipline: Health economics
- Language: English
- Edited by: Massimo Moscarelli

Publication details
- History: 1998-present
- Publisher: International Center of Mental Health Policy and Economics
- Frequency: Quarterly
- Impact factor: 1.6 (2022)

Standard abbreviations
- ISO 4: J. Ment. Health Policy Econ.

Indexing
- CODEN: JMHPAR
- ISSN: 1091-4358 (print); 1099-176X (web)
- LCCN: sn96004829
- OCLC no.: 44093293

Links
- Journal homepage

The Journal of Mental Health Policy and Economics is a quarterly peer-reviewed academic journal published by the International Center of Mental Health Policy and Economics. It is the official journal of the Section on Mental Health Economics of the World Psychiatric Association.It covers topics related to mental health and health economics, and in particular the financing and organisation of psychiatry services.

== Abstracting and indexing ==
The journal is abstracted and indexed in Index Medicus/MEDLINE/PubMed, Journal of Economic Literature/EconLit, Social Sciences Citation Index, and Current Contents/Social & Behavioral Sciences. According to the Journal Citation Reports, the journal has a 2022 impact factor of 1.6.
