= Danuta Wasserman =

Professor of psychiatry

- Other name: Danuta Wolk-Wasserman

Academic background
- Education: Uppsala University
- Thesis: Attempted suicide : the patient's family, social network and therapy (1986)

Danuta Elizabeth Wasserman is a professor of psychiatry and suicidology at Karolinska Institutet in Sweden. She is a public mental health and medical educator. She is currently the President of the World Psychiatric Association (WPA) 2023-2026.

== Early life ==
Wasserman was born in Warsaw, Poland to Nikolai Stefan and Stefania Maria (nee Smolarek) Wolk. Wasserman migrated to Sweden in 1968, where she now permanently resides in Stockholm.

== Education ==
Wasserman completed a Bachelor of Medicine and a Bachelor of Arts in psychology in 1968 at Jagiellonian University in Kraków, Poland. She continued her medical studies in Sweden and in 1972 obtained a Clinical Medical Degree from Uppsala University. In 1979, Wasserman became registered as a specialist in General Psychiatry by the Swedish National Board of Health and Welfare. Wasserman defended her PhD thesis in 1986 on “Attempted suicide – the patient’s family, social network and therapy” at Karolinska Institutet. In 1989, Wasserman concluded her psychoanalytic training at the Swedish Psychoanalytical Institute.

== Career ==
Wasserman founded and became the head of the National Swedish Centre for Suicide Research and Prevention of Mental Ill-Health (NASP) in 1993 and was the head of NASP until January 1, 2024. In this role, Wasserman has contributed to national suicide prevention strategies in Sweden. In 1990, Wasserman became an associate professor at Karolinska Insititutet. In 1995, she became a professor in suicide prevention at the National Institute for Psychosocial Medicine, and in 2002 she became a professor in psychiatry and suicidology at Karolinska Institutet. Between 2002 - 2007, Wasserman was the head of the Public Health Sciences department at Karolinska Institutet.

Since 1997 and presently, Wasserman is the director for the World Health Organization’s (WHO) Lead Collaborating Centre for Research, Methods, Development and Training in Suicide Prevention. In 2020, Wasserman became the President-Elect of the World Psychiatric Association. Since October 1, 2023, she is the President of the World Psychiatric Association (WPA) 2023-2026.

== Research ==
Wasserman’s research integrates social, psychiatric and genetic aspects and is oriented towards the prevention of mental health problems and suicide. She is the Editor of Suicide an Unnecessary Death (2001), which has been translated to Japanese, Chinese, and Russian in 2006.

== Selected publications ==
- Wasserman, Danuta (2016). Suicide:an unnecessary death. [London]: Oxford University Press. ISBN 978-0198717393. OCLC 47120102. (Note: Reviews of Suicide - an unnecessary death)
- Wasserman, Danuta (2021). Oxford textbook of suicidology and suicide prevention (2 edn). [London]: Oxford University Press. ISBN 978-0191873805. OCLC 47120102.
- Wasserman, Danuta (2009). Oxford textbook of suicidology and suicide prevention (1 edn). [London]: Oxford University Press. ISBN 978-0199640461. OCLC 47120102.
- Wasserman, Danuta (2004). "Achieving equality, inclusiveness, and cultural sensitivity in mental health (EDIT)". World Psychiatry. 23 (2): 302–303. doi:10.1002/wps.21220. PMC 11083866. PMID 38727045.
- Wasserman, D.; Sokolowski, M. (2020). "Genetics of HPA-axis, depression and suicidality". European Psychiatry. 25 (5): 278–280. doi:10.1016/j.eurpsy.2009.12.016. PMID 20444578.
- Buckland-Wright, Helen (October 2022). "Suicide: An Unnecessary Death Danuta Wasserman (Ed.) London: Martin Dunitz Ltd, 2001. pp. 227. (paperback). ISBN 1-85317-822-5". Behavioural and Cognitive Psychotherapy. 30 (4): 507–512. doi:10.1017/S1352465802234116. S2CID 143380299.
- Persaud, Raj (2001). "Review of Suicide: An Unnecessary Death". British Medical Journal. 323 (7304): 114. doi:10.1136/bmj.323.7304.114. ISSN 0959-8138. JSTOR 25467388. PMC 1120728. S2CID 70906354.
- Heisel, Marnin J. (June 2004). "Suicide: An Unnecessary Death". International Psychogeriatrics. 16 (2): 242–244. doi:10.1017/S104161020423037X. S2CID 145420694.
- Wasserman, Danuta; Cheng, Qi; Jiang, Guo-Xin (2005). "Global suicide rates among young people aged 15-19". World Psychiatry. 4 (2): 114–120. ISSN 1723-8617. PMC 1414751. PMID 16633527.
- Wasserman, D.; Rihmer, Z.; Rujescu, D.; Sarchiapone, M.; Sokolowski, M.; Titelman, D.; Zalsman, G.; Zemishlany, Z.; Carli, V. (2012). "The European Psychiatric Association (EPA) guidance on suicide treatment and prevention". European Psychiatry. 27 (2): 129–141. doi:10.1016/j.eurpsy.2011.06.003. ISSN 0924-9338. PMID 22137775. S2CID 1625392.
- Wasserman, Danuta (2011). Depression (2nd ed.). Oxford: Oxford University Press. ISBN 978-0-19-163150-4. OCLC 801405497.
- Wasserman, Danuta; Hoven, Christina W.; Wasserman, Camilla; Wall, Melanie; Eisenberg, Ruth; Hadlaczky, Gergö; Kelleher, Ian; Sarchiapone, Marco; Apter, Alan; Balazs, Judit; Bobes, Julio; Brunner, Romuald; Corcoran, Paul; Cosman, Doina; Guillemin, Francis (2015-04-18). "School-based suicide prevention programmes: the SEYLE cluster-randomised, controlled trial". The Lancet. 385 (9977): 1536–1544. doi:10.1016/S0140-6736(14)61213-7. hdl:10651/33389. ISSN 0140-6736. PMID 25579833. S2CID 8401201.
- Ringskog Vagnhammar, Susanna; Wasserman, Danuta (2017). Första hjälpen vid självmordsrisk (Andra upplagan ed.). Lund. ISBN 978-91-44-11300-5. OCLC 1016177683.

== Honors and awards ==
In 2022 she received the Pascal-Boyle Prize for outstanding achievement by a woman working to improve mental health care in Europe. In 2021 she received the Morselli Medal from the International Academy for Suicide Research from USA, In 2017 she received Gold Medal of 8th size in the ribbon of the Order of the Seraphim for her contribution to suicide research from the King of Sweden Carl XVI Gustaf. In 2012 she received the British Medical Association Book Award for Public Understanding of Science for Depression – The Facts. In 2008 she received the Public Health Prize from the Nordic Council of Ministers of Health for outstanding contributions to public mental health research and prevention. In 2005, Wasserman received the research award from the American Foundation for Suicide Research. and in the same year, she received the Hans Rost Prize from the German Association for Suicide Prevention for contributions to suicide research and prevention. In 1993 she received the Stengel Research Award for outstanding contributions in suicide research and prevention from the International Association for Suicide Prevention and Crisis Intervention (IASP), and in 1993 she received the Swedish Medical Association Award to Senior Researcher.

She is an Honorary member of the Hungarian and Romanian Psychiatric Association, Honorary fellow of the European Society of Social Psychiatry, Royal College of Psychiatrists, and European Psychiatric Association.
