= Personality and Mental Health =

- Discipline: Forensic psychiatry
- Language: English

Publication details
- History: 2007–present
- Publisher: Wiley-Blackwell on behalf of the Centre for Health and Justice
- Frequency: Quarterly
- Impact factor: 3.8 (2020)

Standard abbreviations
- ISO 4: Pers. Ment. Health
- NLM: Personal Ment Health

Indexing
- ISSN: 1932-8621 (print); 1932-863X (web)

Links
- Journal homepage; Online access; Online archive

Personality and Mental Health: Multidisciplinary Studies from Personality Dysfunction to Criminal Behaviour is a quarterly peer-reviewed academic journal published by Wiley-Blackwell on behalf of the Centre for Health and Justice. The journal was established in 2007 and covers research in mental health issues such as DSM-IV-defined personality disorders, psychopathy, and offending behaviour.

According to the Journal Citation Reports, the journal has a 2011 impact factor of 0.733, ranking it 46th out of 59 journals in the category "Psychology Social" and 97th out of 117 in the category "Psychiatry (Social Science)".
