= Ahmed Okasha =

Egyptian psychiatrist

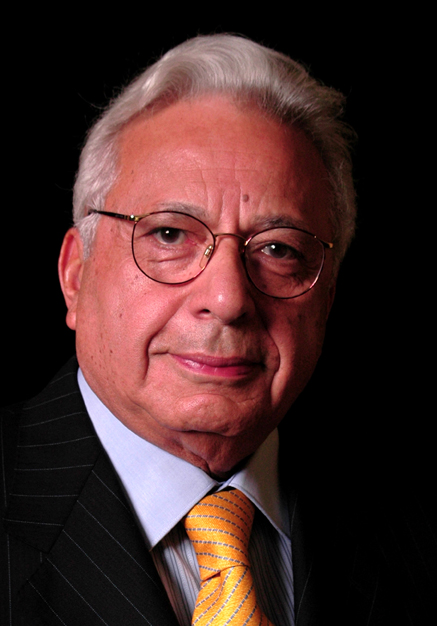
- Born: 1935 (age 90–91); Egypt
- Occupation: Psychiatrist

Ahmed Okasha is an Egyptian psychiatrist. He is a professor of psychiatry at Ain Shams University Faculty of Medicine, Cairo, Egypt. He wrote books and articles about psychiatry and mental disorders. He is the first Arab-Muslim to be president of World Psychiatric Association from 2002 to 2005.

== Career ==
- Professor of psychiatry, founder and emeritus chairman – Institute of Psychiatry
- Director of WHO Collaborating Center For training and research
- in mental health, Institute of Psychiatry – Ain Shams University, Cairo
- Honorary president of Egyptian Psychiatric Association
- Honorary president of the Arab Federation of Psychiatrists
- President of the World Psychiatric Association (2002–2005)
- Member of the Egyptian Presidential Advisory Council of Distinguished Scientists
- (For Mental Health and community integration)
- Adviser to the Egyptian President to Mental Health and Community Harmony
- Member of the Supreme Council of Addressing Fundamentalism and Terrorism
- Member of the scientific council of the Egyptian Academy of Science and Technology

== History ==
Founder and honorary chairman of the Institute of Psychiatry.

=== Education ===
- MB BCh from Ain Shams University Faculty of Medicine, Cairo, Egypt
- MSc from Ain Shams University Faculty of Medicine
- M.D., Ph.D. in Psychiatry from Ain Shams University Faculty of Medicine
- FRCP (Edin.), FRCPsych (Lond.), FACP (Hon)
- MB, BCH, Ain Shams University, Cairo, 1957.
- Diploma of Psychological Medical and Neurology, Institute of Psychiatry and Neurology, 1961.
- Membership of Royal College of Physicians, Psychiatry (Edin.), 1963.
- Fellowship of Royal College of Physicians (Edin), 1973.
- Fellowship of Royal College of Psychiatrists (London), 1973.
- Diploma of Psychotherapy and behavior therapy for international Academy (Colorado).

== Scientific and clinical career ==
- Founder and Honorary Chairman Institute of Psychiatry, Ain Shams University
- Professor and Director of WHO Collaborating Center for Training and Research in Mental Health, Institute of Psychiatry – Ain Shams University, Cairo
- Member Expert Advisory Panel in Mental Health – WHO – Geneva.
- President Egyptian Psychiatric Association
- President Arab Federation of Psychiatrists
- Honorary President World Psychiatric Association
- Council member World Psychiatric Association
- President of the Egyptian Society of Biological Psychiatry, of WFSBP
- Chairman of the Review and Ethics Committee of World Psychiatric Association (2011–2014)
- Honorary Fellowship of the American College of Psychiatrists (2002)
- Fellow of Royal College of Psychiatrists (London, 1973)
- Fellow of Royal College of Physicians (Edinburgh, 1973)
- Honorary Fellow of World Psychiatric Association (2005)
- International Distinguished Fellow of APA
- Presidential Commendation of APA (2006)

=== World Psychiatric Association positions ===
* President of World Psychiatric Association	2002 – 2005
* Chairperson of the Presidential WPA program on Global Child Mental Health	2002 – 2005
* Chairman of the WPA Stigma program	2002 – 2005
* Chairman of WPA Program to promote Mental Health Services in SubSaharan Africa and Central Asia	1999 - 2002
* Chairman of WPA Program for Post-graduate Curriculum, Psychiatry	1999 - 2002
* President-Elect (Vice President) of World Psychiatric Association	1999 – 2002
* Chairman of Ethics' Committee of WPA	1993 - 2002
* Chairperson of Section of Public Policy and Psychiatry	1993 - 1999
* Secretary for Sections, World Psychiatric Association	1993 - 1999
* Honorary fellow of WPA	2005
* Chairman of WPA Review Committee * Chairman of WPA Review and Ethics Committee * Member of WPA Council (Past Presidents) * Chairman of the Presidential Program on Child Mental Health (An area of global neglect)	2008 - 2011 2011 - 2014 2005 - Till now (2002 - 2005)

=== World Health Organization positions and activities ===
* Director, WHO Collaborating Center for Research and Training in Mental Health, Okasha Institute of Psychiatry, Cairo	1990 - 2014
* Member of the advisory panel in Mental Health - WHO - Geneva	1981 – 2012
* Director of ICD-10 field studies in Eastern Mediterranean WHO	1990 - 1999
* Member of the Advisory Board of ICD - 11, Geneva	2005

=== National and international positions and activities ===
* Head of Psychiatric unit - Ain shams University	1966 – 1990
* Chairman of Okasha Institute of Psychiatry - Ain shams University * Member of the Board of Seniors (El Hokamaa) - Ain Shams University * Member of the National Board of trustees – Zewail City of Science and Technology * Member of the Supreme Council for Culture	1990 – 1995 2009 - Present 2010 - Present 2012 - Present
* Chairman of Neuropsychiatry Department – Ain Shams University	1990 - 1995
* Chairman of the Committee of promoting Professors and assistant Professors of Psychiatry of the supreme council of Egyptian Universities	2008 - 2012
* President of the Egyptian Board of Psychiatry. High Committee of medical specialties. Ministry of Health and population.	2002 – Present
* Vice President of the International Academy of Psychotherapy and Behavioral Medicine, Colorado USA	1996 - Present
* President of the Egyptian Psychiatric Association	1981 – 1999 2006 - 2016
* President of the Arab Federation of Psychiatrists * Honorary President of the Arab Federation of Psychiatrists * Member of the National Council of Addiction Fund	1993 – 1996 2008 - 2010 2010 – life long
* President of the Egyptian Biological Psychiatry Society, World Federation of Biological Psychiatry	1989 - present
* Member of the High Court of Ethics - Egypt	1990 - 1993
* Member of the Scientific Committee of the Higher Council for Addressing Narcotics in Egypt	1992 - present
* President of the Franco-Egyptian Psychiatric Association	1986 - 2002
* Consultant to the Egyptian Minister of Justice in Forensic Psychiatry	1984 – 1996
* Member of Executive Committee of CIOMS (Council For International Organizations of Medical Sciences) (WHO + UNESCO)	2007 - 2010

=== Publications ===
- Editor and contributor of 47 books in the field of psychiatry and psychology in both the Arabic and English languages (see books at Okasha books. He was one of the founders of the Ain Shams Institute of Psychiatry.
- Supervised 85 MD theses and 150 master theses.
- Published 284 original articles in national and international journals.
- Author of 58 books in the field of psychiatry and psychology in both the Arabic and English languages, including two textbooks in Arabic and English, 36 books published abroad.

== Prizes and awards ==
- Fellow of the Royal College of Physicians (Edin.), 1974
- Fellow of the Royal College of Psychiatrists (London), 1974
- Distinguished international fellow of the American Psychiatric Association, 1983
- Fellow of the French Medico Psychological society, 1984
- Honorary doctorate in Medical education (Luzanne), 2000
- Awarded the honorary fellowship of the American College of Psychiatrists, 2001
- Honorary member of Czech Psychiatric Association, 2004
- Honorary fellow of World Psychiatric Association, 2005
- Presidential commendation of American Psychiatric Association, 2006
- Awarded the golden Medal of IACAPAP (International Association for Child and Adolescent Psychiatry and Allied Professions), 2012
- Awarded Kraeplin – Alzheimer Medal, LMU Munich, 2012
- The Merit Medal of Science and Art (first class), 2013
- Member of the Egyptian Presidential Advisory Council of Distinguished Scientists and Experts (Mental Health and Community Integration), 2014
- Adviser to the Egyptian President to Mental Health and Community Harmony, 2017
- Member of the Supreme Council of Addressing Fundamentalism and Terrorism, 2017
- Awards from the Egyptian Academy of Science – The State award for Creativity in Medicine, 2000 – The State merit prize of Medical Sciences, & 2007 – El Nil (Mubarak) award for Medical Sciences, 2010 – The Medal of Science and Art (First Degree), 2013
- Member of the Scientific Council of the Egyptian Academy of Science and Technology
- Member of the Egyptian Presidential Council of Scientist (Mental health and community harmony)

== The WPA Okasha Award for developing countries ==
The award includes a diploma, a medal and a donation of US$15,000, given to the two winners since 2005. The Okasha Award recognizes the contribution of two young psychiatrists or neuroscientists, below the age of 40, whose research efforts have best served psychiatry and mental health in a developing country.

== Okasha Institute of Psychiatry ==
The Ain Shams Institute of Psychiatry was named after Prof Okasha in January 2011.

== Chapters in international books ==
1. “Suicide In Asia And The Middle East” (Egypt) Eds. Lee A. Headley, California Press, 1983.
2. “International Classification in Psychiatry Unity and Diversity" (The Egyptian Diagnostic System (DMP-I)) Eds. Mezzich and Michael von Cranach, Cambridge Press, 1990.
3. International Review of Psychiatry Series" Eds. Mezzich et al (American Press), 1993.
4. Interpersonal Factors in the Origin and Course of Affective Disorders". (Expressed emotion in families of a sample of Egyptian depressive patients), Eds. Mundt et al. The Royal College of Psychiatrists. UK, 1996.
5. Manage or Perish? The Challenges of managed Mental Health care in Europe” (Challenges of Managed Mental Health Care in the south-East Mediterranean Region) Eds. Jose Guimon and Norman Sartorius. Kluwer Academic/Plenum Publishers 1999
6. “Al-Junun” Mental Illness in the Islamic World (Oxford Press) 2000
7. “Somatoform Disorders A worldwide perspective”, (Somatoform Disorders – An Arab perspective)" Eds. Y. Ono, a, Janca, M. A. Sai and N. Sartorius - Springer, 1999.
8. Issues in Preventive Psychiatry" (Prevention of Deontological Mistakes: The Role of Ethical Codes) Eds. G. N. Christodoulou, D. Lecic – Tosevski and V. P. Kontaxakis. KARGER 1999
9. Psychiatry” (Professional Ethics and boundaries) Eds. Allan Tasman, Jerald Kay and Jeffrey A. Lieberman. John Wiley, 2003
10. “A Century of Psychiatry"(International Psychiatry and the work of the WPA) Ed. Hugh Freeman. Mosby and Wolfe, 1999
11. “Depressive Disorders" (Depression and its treatment: a General Health Problem) Eds. Mario Maj and Norman Sartorius. John Wiley and Sons. Volume 1. 1999
12. “Schizophrenia" Eds. Mario Maj and Norman Sartorius. John Wiley and Sons. Volume 2. 1999
13. “Oxford Textbook of Philosophy and Psychiatry" Eds. Fulford et al. 2006
14. “The Overlap of Affective and Schizophrenia Spectra" (The Concept of Schizoaffective disorder: Utility versus validity and reliability – A Transcultural Perspective) Eds. Andreas Marneros and Hagop Akiskal, Cambridge University Press, 2007
15. “Culture And Mental Health, A Comprehensive Textbook" (North Africa focus on Psychiatry in Egypt) Eds. Kamaldeep Bhui and Dinesh Bhugra. Hodder Arnold, 2007
16. “Medicine of the Person Faith, Science and Value in the Health Care Provision” (The individual versus the family: an Islamic and Traditional Societies Perspective) Eds. John Cox, A; Astair V. Campbell and Bill (K.W.M.) Fulford. Jessica Kingsley London and Philadelphia. 2007
17. “Oxford Textbook of Suicidology " (Suicide Behavior and Sub-Syndromal Disorders - An Arab Perspective) Eds. Wassermann et al. 2010
18. "Spirituality and Religion" Eds. Haroon Rashid Chaudry et al., 2009
19. "Religion and Psychiatry: beyond boundaries" Eds. Peter Verhagen et al, Wiley knowledge for generations, 2010.
20. “Wars, insurgencies and terrorist attacks: a psycho-social perspective from the Muslim world" Ed. Unaiza Niaz, John Wiley & Sons, 2011.
21. “Coercive treatment in psychiatry - clinical, legal and ethical aspects", Eds: Thomas Kallert et al., John Wiley & Sons, 2011.

=== Editor of books in English ===
1. Clinical Psychiatry, 1986, Dar El Khotob
2. Okasha Clinical Psychiatry, 1988, Anglo Egyptian Bookshop
3. ICD-10 CASE BOOKS", Eds. Okasha et al. American Psychiatric Press, 1996.
4. "OBSESSIVE COMPULSIVE DISORDER" Eds. Okasha et al. WPA Evidence and Experience in Psychiatry Volume 4 John Wiley and Sons. 2002
5. "ETHICS, CULTURE AND PSYCHIATRY", Eds. Okasha et al. American Psychiatric Press 2000
6. "IMAGES IN PSYCHIATRY - THE ARAB WORLD", Eds. Okasha et al. WPA Series, The Scientific Publishing House, 2001
7. "PSYCHIATRY IN SOCIETY" Eds. Okasha et al., John Wiley and Sons, 2003
8. "PHOBIAS", Eds. Okasha et al. WPA Series Evidence and Experience in Psychiatry Volume 7. John Wiley and Sons, 2004
9. "PERSONALITY DISORDERS" Volume 8 in the WPA Evidence & Experience in Psychiatry”, Eds. Okasha et al., 2004.
10. "FAMILIES AND MENTAL DISORDERS FROM BURDEN TO EMPOWERMENT" Eds. Okasha et al., John Wiley and Sons, 2005
11. "EARLY DETECTION AND MANAGEMENT OF MENTAL DISORDERS". Eds. Okasha et al., John Wiley and Sons, 2005
12. "DISASTERS AND MENTAL HEALTH" Eds. Okasha et al., John Wiley and Sons, 2005.
13. "SOMATOFORM DISORDERS", Eds. Okasha et al., John Wiley and Sons, 2005.
14. "PERSPECTIVES ON THE STIGMA OF MENTAL ILLNESS" Eds. Okasha et al., WPA 2005
15. "THE MENTAL HEALTH OF CHILDREN AND ADOLESCENTS – AN AREA OF GLOBAL NEGLECT" Eds. Okasha et al. John Wiley and Sons 2007
16. "CONTEMPORARY TOPICS IN WOMAN’S MENTAL HEALTH" GLOBAL PERSPECTIVE IN A CHANGING SOCIETY Eds. Okasha et al. John Wiley and Sons, 2009.

=== Editor of books in Arabic ===
1. Contemporary Psychiatry (15th edition) 2010 - Anglo Egyptian Bookshop.
2. Behavioral Sciences, 1996 - Anglo Egyptian Bookshop
3. Basis of Clinical Psychology, 1996 - Anglo Egyptian Bookshop
4. A guide of psychology, 1990 - Anglo Egyptian Bookshop
5. Medical Psychology (4th Edition) 1994 - Anglo Egyptian Bookshop
6. Physiological Psychology (12th edition) 2009 - Anglo Egyptian Bookshop.
7. Leonardo Divinci (Introduction and translation), 1970 - Anglo Egyptian
8. Answers that are frightening, 1977 – Ghareeb Bookshop
9. There is management for addiction, 1985 – Series Books for all.
10. There is an addict in our House, 1985 – Ministry of Culture.
11. There is a cure for your suffering, 1973 – El Moaalam Publisher – Beirut.
12. Holes in the conscience. 2001 – Dar EL Shorouk. 5th Edition 2009
13. Horizons of artistic creativity “A Psychological Perspectives, “2002 - Dar EL Shorouk.
14. The anatomical dissection of the Egyptian Personality, 2009 - Dar EL Shorouk
15. Psychological Satisfaction, 2008, El Akhbar Medical book.
16. Psychotropic drugs, 1979
17. Lithium therapy, 1985
18. Psychopathology of Anxiety, 1981
19. 10th Revision of Mental and Behavioral disorders, 1999, WHO - EMRO, Arabic translation
20. The path to Happiness (Karma Book Shop), 2015

== Published papers ==
1963

1. Side effects from reserpine therapy in Egyptian psychotics: S. Abd El Naby, A. Okasha and M. F. Abo El Magd E. J. Neurol. Psychiat. Neurosurg. Vol. IV, No. 1 & 2, 1963, pp. 57-69

1964

2. Psychosis in Egyptian pellagrins. S. Abd EI Naby and A. Okasha, Med J of Cairo Univ. vol. XXXII, No. 3 & 4, 1964. pp. 325-335

3. Studies on the effects of oestradiol dipropionate in insulin coma therapy in different types of schizophrenia. Abd El Naby, A. Okasha, T. Fahmi Y.A. Habib E J Neurol Psych Neurosurg, vol. V, No. 1 & 2, 1964. pp. 11-19 S.

4. 17-ketogenic steroids in schizophrenia. A. Okasha S. Abd el Naby and M. H. El Mahdy. E J Neurol Psychiat Neurosurg, vol V, No. 1 & 2, 1964. E J Neurol Psychiat Neurosurg, vol. V, No 1 & 2, 1964. pp. 1-9

5. Clinical and electromyographic studies in leprotic facial affection. S. Abd El Naby, Khalil S. Kayad, A. Okasha, M. Abdel Hady, O. Madkour and N. M. Montasser E J Neurol Psychiat Neurosurg, vol. V, No 1&2, 1964. pp. 20-32

6. Haloperidol: A controlled clinical trial in chronic disturbed psychotic patients. A. Okasha and G. I. Tewfik Br J Psych, vol. 110, 464, 1964. pp. 56-60

7. The abuse and the selective use of tranquilizers. A. Okasha Ain Shams Medical Journal, vol. 15, No. 2, 1964. pp. 77-90

8. Day hospital treatment in psychiatry. A. Okasha E J Neurol Psychiat Neurosurg, vol. V, No 1, 1964. pp. 105-113

1965

9. Psychosis and immigration. A. Okasha. Postgrad. Med. J., 41, 1965. pp. 603-612

1966

10. A cultural psychiatric study of El Zar cult in the UAR. A. Okasah. Br J Psych, vol. 112, 1966. pp. 1217-1221

11. Positive conditioning in nocturnal enuresis. A. Okasha and A. Hassan J. Egypt. Med. Assoc., 49, 9/10, 1966. pp. 601-610

1967

12. LSD in stammering. A. Okasha. E. J. Neurol. Psychiat. Neurosurg, 1967.

13. Hysteria, its presentation and management in Egypt. A. Okasha Ain Shams Med. J., vol. 18, no. 1-2, 1967.

1968

14. Mutabon - A controlled clinical trial in psychiatric patients. A. Okasha. Ain Shams Med J., vol. 19, no. 3, 1968. pp. 159-163

15. Preliminary psychiatric observations in Egypt. A. Okasha, M. Kamel and A. H. Hassan

Brit. J. Psych., vol. 114, no. 513, 1968. pp. 949-955

1969

16. Tranquilizers in general practice. A. Okasha Current practice, 1969. Vol 20 No. 3 pp. 275 -285

1970

17. Presentation and outcome of obsessional disorders in Egypt. A. Okasha Ain Shams Med. J., vol. 21, no. 4, 1970. pp. 367-374

1971

18. Presentation of depression in Egyptian children. A. Okasha and M. Kamel E. J. Neurol Psychiat Neurosurg, vol. xii, no 162, 1971. pp. 27-35.

19. Psychosocial Study of Stammering in Egyptian Children. A. Okasha, Z. Bishry, M. Essawi, M. Kamel and A. H. Hassan. E. J. Neurol. Psychiat. Neurosurg., 1971, Vol. XII. No. 1 and 2 p. 37

1972

20. A psychiatric study of Egyptian rheumatic arthritis. A. Okasha, N. Bahgat, A. Sadek and M. Kamel

Proceedings of the Egyptian society of rheumatology, vol. ix, no. 1, 1972. pp. 85-97

1973

21. Psychometry for organicity: validity and clinical use of some tests. A. Okasha. E. J. Neurol. Psychiat. Neurosurg, vol. xiv, no. 162, 1973.

22. A psychiatric survey of nocturnal enuresis in an Egyptian community. A. Okasha, O. Sherbini and M. Mostafa E. J. Neurol. Psychiat. Neurosurg, vol. xiv, no. 162, 1973.

23. A comparison of lorazepam diazepam and placebo in anxiety states. A. Okasha, A Sadek

Journal of International Medical Research, 1, 162, 1973. pp. 162-165

24. An electromyographic study of functional impotence. Ain Shams Med. J., vol. 24, no. 3-4, 1973. pp. 139-148 Preliminary psychiatric observations in Libya. M. Kamel Zeinab Bishry, Ahmed Okasha Psychopathologie Africaine, vol. ix, no. 3, 1973. pp. 371-387

25. A double blind trial for the clinical management of psychogenic headache. A. Okasha, H. A. Ghaleb and A. Sadek Br. J. Psychiat. Vol. 122, no. 567, 1973. pp. 181-183

26. EEG screening of brain damage in psychiatric patients a validation study. A. Okasha, A. M. Ashour, M. Moustsfa and A. H. Hassan E.J. Neuro Psychiatric Neurosurge. 1973. Vol XIV No. 122 pp. 35-66

1974

27. Psychological study of stammering in Egyptian children. A. Okasha, Z. Bishry, M. Kamel and A. H. Hassan Br. J. Psychiat., vol. 124, 1974. pp. 531-533.

28. Electroencephalographic study of stammering. A. Okasha, S. Abdel Moneim, Z. Bishry, M. Kamel and M. Mostafa Br. J. Psychiat., vol. 124, 1974. pp. 534-535

29. Biological factor in schizophrenia. A. Okasha. Ain shams Medical Journal. 1974 pp. 149-151

1975

30. Psychosocial and Electroencephalographic studies of Egyptian murderers.

A. Okasha, A. Sadek and S. Abdel Moneim Br. J. Psychiatry, vol. 126, 1975. pp. 34-40

31. Parameters for differentiation between hysterical and epileptic fits among Egyptian military recruits. Ahmed Okasha, M. Moustafa, M. Kamel, N. R. Bishay Ain Shams Med. J., vol. 26, no. 4, 1975.

32. Arabic study of cases of functional sexual inadequacy. A. Okasha and A. Demerdash Br. J. Psychiatry, vol., 126, 1975. pp. 446-448

33. Insomnia: a differential parameter in Egyptian depressives. A. Okasha, M. Kamel, F. Lotaif and Z. Bishry

Ain Shams Med. J., vol. 26, no. 566, 1975. pp. 605-612

34. Psychosocial and neurological assessment of hyperkinetic children (6-12 years). A. Okasha, A. Sadek and S. Abdel Moneim E. J. Neurol. Psychiat. Neurosurg., vol. XV, no. 162, 1975. pp. 169-184

35. Objective evaluation of drug therapy in hyperkinetic children. A. Okasha, Z. Bishry, M. Kamel, S. Abdel Moneim, M. Michel and M. Mostafa E. J. Neurol. Psychiat. Neurosurg., vol. XV, no. 162, 1975. pp. 185-198

36. The influence of Egyptian culture on psychiatric symptomatology. A. Okasha. Egyptian Journal of Mental Health 1975 Vol 16 pp. 1-7

37. A combined psychiatric and surgical study of duodenal ulcer in Egyptians and its postoperative consequences. M. Kamel, A. F. Bahnassy, Z. Bishry, H. Abdallah, A. Okasha and M. Mamoon. Egypt. J. Gastroenterol. 1975, vol. 8, no. 16-18, pp. 3-26

1976

38. A psychometric study of cases of psychogenic sexual inadequacy. Ahmed Okasha, A. Demerdash and M. Kamel Ain Shams Med. J. Vol., 27, No. 566, 1976. pp. 423-427

39. An anthropometric survey of cases of psychogenic sexual dysfunction. A. Okasha, M. Demerdash and M. Kamel Ain Shams Med. J. Vol., 27, 1976. pp. 179-181

40. A psychosocial study of accidental poisoning in Egyptian children. A. Okasha, Z. Bishry, N.M. Osman, M. Kamel Br. J. Psychiat. 1976. 129, pp. 539-543,

41. A controlled double blind clinical trial between maprotilene and amitriptyline in depressive illness. A. Okasha and A. Sadek J. Egypt. Med. Assoc. 1976. 59, pp. 557-562,

1977

42. Psychiatric morbidity among university students in Egypt. Ahmed Okasha, M. Kamel, a. Sadek, F. Lotaif and Z. Bishry Br. J. Psychiat. 1977. 131, pp. 149-54,

43. Psychiatric symptomatology in Egypt. A. Okasha. Mental Health and Society, 1977. Vol. 4, no. 3-4, pp. 121-125

44. Laboratory and histochemical study of weight gain after amitriptyline. M. Kamel, Sawsan H. Hamza, Zeinab Bishry, A. Okasha, R.R. Hassanein and Saira Fahmy Ain Shams Med. J., 1977. vol. 28, no. 1 & 2, pp. 63-67

45. Comparative study on propanidid and thiopentone in ECT. A. Okasha. Ain Shams Med. J., 1977. Vol. 28, no. 3 & 4,

1978

46. Mental disorders in Pharaonic Egypt. A. Okasha Egypt. J. Psychiat. 1978 vol. 1, no. 1,

47. Levels of HIAA and VMA in CSF of schizophrenics before and after treatment. A. Okasha, S. Z. Eid, Z. Bishry, F. Lotaif and J. F. Gouda Egypt. J. Psychiat. 1978.vol. 1, no. 1, pp. 38-50

48. A cross-cultural study of cases of functional sexual disorders among Arabs. A. Demerdash, F. Lotaif, Z. Bishry and A. Ashour and A. Okasha Egypt. J. Psychiat., 1978. Vol. 1, no. 1 pp. 51-56

1979

49 . Attempted suicide: An Egyptian investigation. A. Okasha and F. Lotaif. Acta Psychiatr Scand. 60, 69-75, 1979.

50. Classification, biochemistry of depression and the mode of action of antidepressant drug. A. Okasha. Egypt. J. Psychiat. 1979 vol. 2, no. 1,

51. The impact of parental loss in childhood on adult anxiety states. A. Okasha, A. Sadek, F. Lotaif and A. M. Ashour Egypt. J. Psychiat. 1979 vol. 2, no. 1, pp. 42-51.

52. Drug induced extrapyramidal side effects in Egyptian schizophrenic patients. A. Okasha, H. El Okbi, A. Sadek, Lotiaf and A. M. Ashour Egypt. J. Psychiat. 1979 vol. 2, no. 2, pp. 191-197.

53. The brain's opium: Human beta-endorphins. A. Okasha. Egypt. J. Psychiat. 1979. vol. 2, no. 1, pp. 135-137

1980

54. A study of memory changes after ECT. N.A. Yousef, E. Lotaif, A. Ashour and A. Okasha

Egypt. J. Psychiat. 1980 vol. 5, no. 1, pp. 83-93

55. Histamine and schizophrenia: A validation study for skin response to intradermally injected histamine in schizophrenia. N. Mahullawy, Z. Bishry, A. M. Ashour & A. Okasha Egypt. J. Psychiat. 1980 vol. 3, no. 1, pp. 117-125

56. Effectiveness of drug therapy in schizophrenia. A. Okasha. Egypt. J. Psychiat. Vol. 3, no. 1, 1980.

57. Depression and anxiety during the menstrual cycle: A psychometric study. A. Okasha, A. Sadek, F. Lotaif, Z. Bishry and A. Ashour Egypt. J. Psychiat. 1980 vol. 3, no. 2, pp. 225-235

58. Is schizophrenia more than one disease? A. Okasha. Egypt. J. Psychiat. 1980 vol. 3, no. 2, pp. 153-158.

59. Carpipramine: A disinhibitory drug in chronic schizophrenia. A. Okasha L'Encephale, 1980 VI, pp. 161-166, 1

1981

60. Prevalence of suicidal feelings in a sample of non-consulting medical students. A. Okasha, F. Lotaif and A. Sadek Acta Psych. Scand., 1981, 63, pp. 409-415,

61. Psychodemographic study of anxiety in Egypt: The PSE in its Arabic version. A. Okasha and A. Ashour Br. J. Psychiat. 1981, 139, pp. 70-73.

62. Correlation between serum and salivary lithium levels. M. Kamel. A. Sadek, F. Lotaif, Z. Bishry and A. Okasha Egypt. J. Psych., 1981 vol. 4, no. 2, 1 pp. 231-246

63. A psychological profile of patients manifesting warts: An Egyptian study. Egypt. J. Psych., 1981, vol. 4, no. 2, pp. 163-177

64. The social readjustment-rating questionnaire: A study of Egyptians. Zeinab Bishry, Mona El Okby, A. Sadek, F. Lotaif and A. Okasha Egypt. J. Psych., 1981. Vol. 4, no. 2, pp. 273-283

65. Viruses as causes of psychiatric diseases. A. Okasha. Egypt. J. Psych., vol. 4, no. 2, 1981.

66. Mental disorders in brain tumors. O. Abdel Ghany, Z. Bishry, F. Lotaif, A. Sadek, A. Ashour, M. Moustafa and A. Okasha Egypt. J. Psych., 1981. Vol. 4, no. 1, pp. 247-262

1982

67. Evaluation of ECT today. A. Okasha. Egypt. J. Psych., 1982. Vol. 5, no. 1, pp. 3-16

68. Psychodemographic and study and psychiatric morbidity of academic difficulty in Egyptian university students. A. Okasha, M. Kamel. A. H. Khalil, F. Lotaif Z. Bishry and A. Sadek. Egypt. J. Psych., vol. 5, no. 1, 1982

69. Drug abuse among university students: An Egyptian study. A. Okasha, M. Kamel, A. H. Khalil, Z. Bishry, F. Lotaif and A. Sadek Egypt. J. Psych. 1982, vol. 5, pp. 59–70

70. Academic difficulty and psychiatric morbidity: an Egyptian study. A. Okasha., M. Kamel, A. H. Khalil, A. Sadek and A. Ashour Egypt. J. Psych., 1982 Vol. 5, no. 1

71. Portrait of old people in Cairo hostels: a morbidity prevalence survey and some empirical correlation. A. Ashour, A. Okasha, A. Sadek, M. Hambali F. Lotaif and Z. Bishry Egypt. J. Psych., 1982 vol. 5, no. 1,

72. Problems of schizoaffective disorders. A. Okasha. Egypt. J. Psych., 1982, vol. 5, no. 2,

73. Clinical study of the inter relationship between complaint of pain and depressive illness. A. Sadek, A. Okasha, O. Al-Sherbini, M. Refaat and F. Lotaif Egypt. J. Psych., 1982 vol. 5, no. 2, pp. 1–9.

74. Psychometric study of the inter relationship between complaint of pain and depressive illness. A. Okasha, A. Sadek, O. Al-Sherbini, M. Refaat and F. Lotaif Egypt. J. Psych., 1982 vol. 5, no. 2,

75. Cortical and central atrophy in Chronic Schizophrenia. A controlled study. Acta Psychiatr Scand. 1982 Jan; 65(1): pp. 29-34

1983

76. An appraisal of DSM-III. A. Okasha. Egypt. J. Psych. 1983, vol. 6, no. 1, pp. 1-6.

77. The elderly females in Abbassia mental hospital: A survey and prospects of relocation. A. Ashour, A. Okasha, F. Sayed, F. Lotaif and M. Kamel. Egypt. J. Psych., 1983 vol. 6, no. 1, pp. 1-16.

78. A psychometric study of cerebral lateralization in depression and schizophrenia. A. Okasha, M. Moutafa and M. Ghanem Egypt. J. Psych., vol. 6, no. 1, 1983

79. Clinical neurophysiology and mental illness. A. Okasha. Egypt. J. Psych., vol. 6, no. 2, 1983

80. Psychiatric morbidity in a mental retardation unit. Okasha, R. Al Fiky, N. A. Youssef and F. Lotaif Egypt. J. Psychiat., vol. 6, no. 2, 1983

81. Psychiatric aspects of female sterilization in Egypt. F. Lotaif, A. Hamed, F. Botrous and A. Okasha Egypt. J. Psych., vol. 6, no. 1, 1983

82. Anxiety, a concomitant of some psychiatric disorders (a psychophysiological approach). A. Seif El Dawla A. Okasha, A. Sadek, A. Hamed and F. Lotaif. Egypt. J. Psych., vol. 6, no. 2, 1983

83. Suicide in Egypt. In Suicide in Asia and the Near East. Edited by Lee A. Headley. University of California Press. pp. 333-349, 1983.

84. Problems of schizoaffective disorders. A. Okasha. Psychiatrica Clinica, vol. 16, no. 2, 4, 1983.

1984

85. Depression and suicide in Egypt. A. Okasha. Egypt. J. Psychiatry 1984, 7 pp. 33-45

86. Insomnia. A. Okasha. Egypt. J. Psych., vol. 7, no. 1, 2, 1984

1985

87. Pharaonic through Islamic and modern psychiatry in Egypt. Psychiatry "The State of Art". Vol. 8, Edited by P. Pichot and P. Berner. Plenum Press. New York. London, 1985.

88. Los jóvenes y la lucha contra el uso indebido de drogas en los paises árabes. Separata del Boletin de Estupefacientes, vol XXXVII, Numems. 2 y 3 – 1985

89. Academic difficulties among male Egyptian students: association with psychiatric morbidity. Okasha, M. Kamel, A. H. Khalil, A. Sadek and A. Ashour Br. J. Psychiatry, 146, 1985.

90. Academic difficulties among male Egyptian student: association with demographic and psychological factors. Br. J. Psychiatry, 146, 1985.

91. Young people and struggle against drug abuse in the Arab countries. A. Okasha. Bulletin on Narcotics, vol. XXXVII, no. 1, 3, 1985.

92. Brain imaging. A Okasha. Egypt. J. Psychiat. Vol. 8, 1, 2, 1985.

93. Is neurosis dead? Egypt. J. Psychiat. Vol. 9, 1985.

94. Visuo spatial abilities in Parkinsonian patients. Egypt. J. Psychiat. Vol. 9, 1985.

95. Depression in Parkinsonian patients: An Egyptian study. Egypt. J. Psychiat. Vol. 9, 1985.

96. Tardive dyskinesia in chronic Egyptian patients on neuroleptics. Egypt. J. Psychiat. Vol. 9, 1985.

97. Attempted suicide in Egypt: a psychodemographic study. Egypt. J. Psychiat. Vol. 9, 1985.

98. Depression in schizophrenia. Egypt. J. Psychiat. Vol. 9, 1985.

99. CT scanning in schizophrenia. Egypt. J. Psychiat. Vol. 9, 1985.

100. The Egyptian diagnostic system (DMP1) comparison with ICD-9, DSM-III. Read in the Conference of International Classifications in Psychiatry, A. Okasha. World Psychiatric Association, Montreal Canada. 1985.

1986

101. Public policy and the chronic mentally ill: an Egyptian perspective. A. Okasha. Read at the Regional symposium of the World Psychiatric Association, Copenhagen, Denmark, 1986.

102. Psychiatric problems in general practice: an Egyptian perspective. A. Okasha Read at the Egyptian French Medical Conference, October 1986.

103. Anticonvulsant as an adjuvant in the treatment of bipolar and schizophrenic disorders. A. Okasha Read at the fourth WHO seminar on Biological Psychiatry in Cairo, November 1986.

104. Tardive dyskinesia in psychosis. A study of its prevalence, psychodemographic and clinical aspects among neuroleptic – treared Egytptian patients. Okasha, A. H Khalil, A Ashour and M. R Elfiky Egypt. J. Psychiatry, 1986, 9: 8-17

105. Descriptive study of attempted suicide in Cairo. A. Okasha, M. Kamel, F. Lotaif, N. El Mahalawy, A. H. Khalil and A. M. Ashour. Egypt. J. Psychiat. (1986), 9:53-70

106. CT Scan findings in Schizophrenia A. Okasha, O. Madkour, M: Ghanem and A.H. Khalil, Egypt. J. Psychiat. (1986), 9: 147 – 160

1987

107. Computerized EEG and evoked potential mapping of brain function. A. Okasha Egypt. J.

Psychiat. Vol. 10. No. 1. 2, 1987.

108. Is it worth treating cases of heroin abuse as inpatients? Egypt. J. Psychiat. vol. 11, 1987.

109. Parkinsonism and Depression: an Egyptian Study A. Okasha, Amira Ahmed Zaki and A. H. Khalil

Egypt. J. Psychiat. (1987), 10: 41–56

110. The Post Partum Psychiatric Disorders: A Descriptive and Epidemiological Study. A. Okasha, N.

Younis, I. Youssef, A. H. Khalil and A. Demerdash. Egypt. J. Psychit. (1987). 10: 161-174

1988

111. Brain mapping in psychiatry. Read at the Second International Egyptian Congress in Psychiatry, A. Okasha March 1988.

112. Brain mapping in suicidal and non-suicidal depressives. A. Okasha and M. Rafaat, October 1988. Egypt. J. Psychiatry, 1988) 11: 17-31

113. Academic underachievement in Egyptian children. Okasha; A. H. Khalil; M. A. El Etribi; M. R. El Fiky and M. Ghanem Egypt. J. Psychiat. Vol. 11, 1988. pp. 127–142

114. Depressive symptoms in Egyptian population: A comparison between urban and rural culture. A. Okasha. Egypt. J. Psychiat. Vol. 11, 1988.

115. Psychiatric aspects of female criminals. A. Okasha. Egypt. J. Psychiat. Vol. 11, 1988.

116. Depression secondary to medical illness. A. Okasha. Egypt. J. Psychiat. Vol. 11, 1988. (Editorial).

1989

117. The concept of mental illness in Pharaonic Egypt to the present day Islam. Read at VIII World Congress of Psychiat, Athens, 1989.

118. Pharmacodynamics, kinetics and therapeutics of benzodiazepines. Read at the IV Arab Congress of Psychiatry. Sanaa - Yemen, 1989.

119. Long-term strategy for the treatment of schizophrenia. Read at the IV Arab Congress of Psychiatry. Sanaa - Yemen, 1989.

120. Neurophysiological substrate for obsessive-compulsive disorder: evidence from topographic brain mapping. Journal of International Review of Psychiatry.

121. Evaluation of epilepsy using EEG frequency analysis and topographic brain mapping. A. Okasha Egypt. Journal of Psychiatry. Vol. 12, no. 1 & 2, 1989.

122. The role of psychiatry in mental health policy formulation: an Egyptian perspective. Read at VIII World Congress of Psychiatry, Athens, 1989. 123. The dilemma of organicity. A. Okasha Egypt. Journal of Psychiatry. Vol. 12, no. 1 & 2, 1989.

124. The biology of obsessive-compulsive disorder. A. Okasha. Egypt. Journal of Psychiatry. Vol. 13, no. 1 April 1989.

125. Psychological understanding of Egyptian heroin users. A.Okasha. Egypt. Journal of Psychiatry. Vol. 13, no. 1 April 1989.

126. Neurophysiological substrate of obsessive-compulsive disorder. Evidence from topographic BEAM. Egypt. Journal of Psychiatry. Vol. 13, no. 1 April 1989.

1990

127. The concept of mental illness from pharaonic times to present day Islam. A world perspective Vol 4, 1990.

1991

128. Carbamazepine versus alprazolam. An augmenting therapy for resistant schizophrenia. Read at the Regional WPA Symposium, Budapest, May 1991.

129. Mental health services in Egypt 1920 to 1990. Read at the Regional WPA symposium, Budapest, May 1991.

130. Mental health services in Egypt. Journal of sociology & social Welfare 1991 Vol. Xviii No. 2

131. Some aspects of the role of the right cerebral hemisphere in psychiatry. Egypt. J. Psychiat. Vol. 14, no. 1 & 2, 1991.

132. Obsessive Compulsive Disorder in Different Cultures "An Egyptian Perspective": The Egyptian Journal of Psychiatry, Vol. 14, No. 1 & 2, April & October 1991.

133. Predicition of the outcome of substance dependence Ain shams Medical Journal. 1991 Vol. 42 No. 10, 11 & 12 pp. 685–692

1992

134. An augmenting therapy for resistant psychotic states. Read at the WPA Regional Symposium, Cairo, 1992.

135. Selective 5HT reuptake inhibitors in psychiatric disorders. Read at the WPA regional symposium, Cairo, 1992.

136. Long term strategy for the treatment of schizophrenia. Read at the WPA regional symposium, Cairo, 1992.

137. Sociocultural aspects of antidepressant therapy. Read at the WPA Regional symposium, Cairo, 1992.

138. The clinical range of 5HT agonists in Psychiatry. Read at the WPA Regional symposium, Cairo, 1992.

139. An effective antidepressant for ambulatory and elderly patient. Read at the WPA Regional symposium, Cairo, 1992.

140. Reliability of ICD-10 research criteria: An Arab perspective. Acta Psych. Scand., 86, pp. 484-488, 1992.

1993

141. Effects of Maprotiline, Nomifensil and Trazodone, GABA Turnover in the limbic system. Egyptian of psychiatry Vol 16: pp. 37–46, 1993

142. Presentation of acute psychosis in an Egyptian sample: Transcultural comparison, Compreh Psych. 34, No. 1, 1993, pp. 4-9.

143. Obsessive compulsive disorder: A Transcultural comparison. Accepted for publication: Italian J. Psych. and Behav Sc., 1993

144. Psychiatry in Egypt. Bulletin of Br. J. Psychiatry, September 1993.

145. Diagnostic agreement in psychiatry: A comparative study between ICD-9, ICD-10 and DSM-IIIR. Br. J. Psychiatry, 162, 621-626, 1993

146. Presentation of hysteria in an Egyptian sample: an update. Neurology, Psychiatry and Brain Research, 1, 3, 1993

147. Mental disorder in Pharonic Egypt. Curare. Vol 16, 1993: pp. 66–70

148. Presentation of Hysteria in a Sample of Egyptian Patients - An Update: Neurology, Psychiatry and Brain Research, 1: 155-159, 1993

149. Presentation of Acute Psychosis in an Egyptian Sample: A Transcultural Comparison: Comprehensive Psychiatry, vol. 34, No. 1 (January/February), pp. 4-9, 1993.

150. Field Trials and Regional Considerations In: International Review of Psychiatry, vol. 1, Costa e Silva J.A. and Nadelson C.C. (eds), American Psychiatric Press, pp. 37-52, 1993.

1994

151. Panic disorder: An overlapping or independent entity, Br. J. Psychiatry, 164, 818-825, 1994

152. Expressed Emotion, Perceived Criticism and Relapse in Depression: A Replication in an Egyptian Community: American Journal of Psychiatry 151:7, July 1994.

153. Panic Disorder: An Overlapping or Independent Entity, British Journal of Psychiatry, 164, 818-825, 1994.

154. Psychiatric Morbidity after Stroke: A Multidimensional Approach, Current Psychiatry, vol. 1 No. 1, July 1994.

155. Phenomenology of Obsessive Compulsive Disorder - A Transcultural study. Comprehensive Psychiatry, vol. 35, No. 3 (May/June), pp. 191 - 197, 1994.

156. A Combined Depot (FLupenthixol and Zuclopenthixol) in Neuroleptic Non-responsive Schizophrenia, Current Psychiatry, vol., 1, 1994

157. Postgraduate Psychiatric Education in the Middle East, International Conference on Postgraduate Education, Al Ain, 1994.

158. Sertraline in OCD: A twelve week, non-comparative study of the safety, efficacy and toleration of Sertraline in the treatment of obsessive compulsive disorder with or without concurrent depression in outpatients

1995

159. Co-morbidity of Axis I and Axis II Diagnoses in a Sample of Egyptian Patients with Neurotic Disorders, accepted for publication in Comprehensive Psychiatry, 1995.

160. Settings for learning: The community beyond. Med. Education. 1995, 29, (Suppl I): 88-90

161. Child Psychiatry in Developing Countries: Present Status: Needs and Demands. Read at the International Congress of Paediatrics, Cairo, 1995

162. Efficient Use of Resources for Mental Health Services: A Developing Country Model: Read at the WPA Regional Symposium in Prague, 1995

163. Primary or Community Care for Psychiatric Patients in developing Countries: Read at the WPA Regional Symposium in Seville, 1995

164. History of psychiatry in Egypt. Current psychiatry. Vol2. No. 2 December 1995

165. Obsessive Compulsive Disorder. A transcultural comparison, IJP Psychiat Sci, 3, 1995

1996

166. The problem of addiction & strategy for management in EGYPT. Current Psychiatry, 1996.

167. Ethnicity and pharmaco psychiatry. Read at Pan Arab Psychiatric Congress, Beirut, 1996.

168. Combat and management of drug abuse: Means and challenges; an Egyptian perspective, Addressed as a plenary lecture in the first international conference in addiction and drug dependence, Cairo, March 1996.

169. Psychological sequels of Political Torture. Read at WPA regional symposium, Belgrade, 1996.

170. Sleep Pattern in patients with OCD (1996): CNS Spectrum, International Journal of Neuropsychioatric Medicine, Vol. 1, no. 2, pp. 39-43.

171. Transcultural Aspects of OCD. Read at World Congress of Psychiatry, Madrid Declaration, 1996.

172. E.R.P. in Schizophrenias. Current psychiatry, 1996.

173. Informed Consent. Mediterranean versus Anglo-Saxon. Read at WPA regional symposium, Geneva, 1996.

174. Madrid declaration. Codes of ethics. Read at WPA regional symposium, Geneva, 1996.

175. Co-morbidity of axis I and II diagnosis in a sample of patients with neurotic disorders. Comprehensive Psychiatry, 1996. Vol. 37, No. 2, pp. 95-101

176. A combined depot (Flupenthixol and Zuclopenthixol) in neuroleptic non-responsive schizophrenics. Current Psychiatry. 1996. Vol. 3. No. 1, pp. 113-122

177. Sleep Patterns in Patients with OCD. CNS Spectrums, 1996. Vol. 1 No. 2, pp. 39-43

178. Measuring the technical efficiency of psychiatric hospitals. J Med Syst. 1996 June; 20(3) pp. 141-50

1997

179. Sertraline in OCD. A twelve-week non-comparative study of the safety, efficacy and toleration of Sertraline in the treatment of obsessive-compulsive disorder with or without concurrent depression in outpatients. Current Psychiatry. 1997. Vol. 4. No. 2 pp. 228-236.

180. Algorithm of management of OCD. Read at WPA regional symposium in Beijing, 1997.

181. Implementations of Core Curriculum of undergraduates of WPA. Read at WPA regional symposium in Beijing, 1997.

182. Non-Conventional treatment of Mental Disorders. Read at World Congress of Psychiatry, 1996. Editorial Psychiatry 1997.

183. The Future of Medical Education and Teaching: A Psychiatric Perspective. American Journal of Psychiatry 1997; 154 (S6): pp. 77-85.

1998

184. A Perspective of Mental Disorder in Pharaonic Egypt. Current Psychiatry. Vol 5 No. 1 March 1998

185. Mental Health Services and research in the Arab World. Acta Psychiatry Scand, 1998.

1999

186. Prevalence of anxiety symptoms in a Sample of Egyptians Children, Current Psychiatry 1999.

187. Core curriculum for undergraduate, read at the 11th World Congress of Psychiatry, Hamburg 1999.

188. Ethics of Euthanasia in Nazi Program, read at the 11th World Congress of Psychiatry, Hamburg August 1999.

189. Challenges of Managed Mental Health Care in the South East Mediterranean region in Manage or Perish, Guimon and Sartorius (Eds.), Kluwer academic/ Plenum publishers, New York, 1999

190. Globalization of Psychiatry, read at the APA annual meeting Washington May 1999

191. Comorbidity of OCD, read at the 11th World Congress of Psychiatry, Hamburg August 1999.

192. Suicide from Pharaonic to present era, read at the World Congress of Suicidology, Athens - November 1999.

193. Neurosciences & future of psychiatry, Current Opinion in Psychiatry, Current Opinion in Psychiatry, 1999, 12: pp. 633-636

194. Burden of depression, read at the regional meeting of the Egyptian Psychiatric Association, Alexandria, Egypt, September 1999.

195. Resistant elderly depressed, read at the regional meeting of the Egyptian Psychiatric Association, Alexandria, Egypt, September 1999.

196. Dual diagnosis, read at the regional meeting of the Egyptian Psychiatric Association, Alexandria, Egypt, 1999.

197. Ethics of treatment of subthreshold psychosis, read at Arab Federation of Psychiatrist Congress, Bahrain, February 1999

198. Religion and mental health at the turn of Century, read at the 11th World Congress of Psychiatry, Hamburg August 1999.

199. Mental Health in the Middle East: an Egyptian Perspective. Clinical Psychology Review, Vol. 19, No. 8, pp. 917-933, 1999

200. Mental Health services in the Arab world. Eastern Mediterranean Health Journal, Vol. 5, No. 2, 1999

201. Prevention of Deontological Mistakes: the Role of Ethical Codes. Preventive Psychiatry Basel, Karger, 1999, pp. 134–142

202. A Psychiatric Study of Nonorganic chronic Headache Patients, Psychosomatics, 1999 40:233-238

203. Anxiety symptoms in an Egyptian Sample: Children and adolescents, In press Current Psychiatry (1999)

204. Somatoform Disorder –An Arab Perspective. Somatoform Disorder: A Worldwide Perspective. (Eds) Y. Ono, A. Janca, M. Asai, N. Sartorius. Springer-Verlag Tokyo 1999.

205. Anxiety disorder in a sample of Egyptian adolescents: A Psycho demographic study. Current Psychiatry, 1999.Vol. 6 No. 3 pp. 342-354

206. Prevalence of anxiety symptoms in a sample of Egyptian children. Current Psychiatry, 1999 Vol. 6 No. 3 pp. 356-368

207. Biological aspects of addiction editorial. Current Opinion in Psychiatry. 1999

208. comments on teaching psychiatry to undergraduates. Isr J Psychiatry Relat Sci. 1999; 36 (4): 293 -6

209. Using data mining to build a customer-focused organization. Manag Care Interface. 1999 Aug; 12(8) 69 – 73, 80

2000

210. Cognitive Dysfunction in OCD. In press, Acta Psychiat. Scandinavica, 2000: 101: 281-285

211. Notes on mental disorder in Pharaonic Egypt, History of Psychiatry, xi (2000), 413-424.

212. Ethics of psychiatry practice: consent, compulsion and confidentiality. Current Opinion in Psychiatry 2000, 13: 693–698

213. From the Hawaii declaration to the Declaration of Madrid. Acta psychiatric Scand. 2000: 101: 20-23

214. The prevalence of obsessive-compulsive symptoms in a sample of Egyptian psychiatric patients. L’Encephale, 2000; xxvi; 1-10

215. Mental Health in Cairo (Al-Qahira) International Journal of Mental Health, vol.28, No. 4, Winter 1999-2000, 62-68

216. Prodromal Symptoms of Relapse in a sample of Egyptian Schizophrenic Patients. J Clin Psychiatry 61: 10, October 2000

217. Forum – Culture, Spirituality and Psychiatry - Comments - Current Opinion in psychiatry. Vol. 13. No. 6 November 2000. pp. 539–541

218. Notes on mental disorders in Pharaonic Egypt (2000): History of psychiatry, xi 413-424.

219. Globalization in Psychiatry (Read at Cairo – Egypt)

220. Highlights on suicide in the Arab World: A perspective from Egypt. (Read at Tahran - Iran)

221. The impact of disease management on outcomes and cost of care: a study of low-income asthma patients. Inquiry. 2000 Summer; 37(2): 188-202

2001

222. Prevalence of Obsessive Compulsive Symptoms (OCS) in a Sample of Egyptian Adolescents. L’Encephale; 2001: XXVII: 8-14

223. Long Term Treatment of Schizophrenia with Risperdal: An International Multi-center Open Label Trial. 2001. (Read at WPA International Congress Vienna – 2003).

224. Forum –Managed Care And Psychiatry, Commentaries. Wendy Max, Richard Warner, Steven S. Sharfstein, Fritz Henn, Luis Salvador-Carulla and Teresa Magallanes, Kari Pylkkanen, Levent Kuey, Ahmed Okasha, Current Opinion in Psychiatry 2001, 14: pp. 287–298

225. Egyptian Contribution to the concept of mental Health. Eastern Mediterranean Health Journal, Vol 7, No. 3, 2001, 1:4.

2002

226. Sleep EEG Findings in ICD-10 Borderline Personality Disorder in Egypt affective disorder.2001. Journal of affective disorder 2001, 71, 11-18 El Sevier

227. A psychiatric training programme for general practitioners in primary health care in Egypt. WPA, Arab PTD program.

228. The strategy and policies of the WPA. World Psychiatry. Oct. 2002. pp. 129-130

229. Mental Health in Africa the Role of WPA. World Psychiatry Oct. 2002. pp. 129-130

230. Ethics, culture and Psychiatry. Seishin Shinkeigaku Zasshi. 2002; 104 (4): 350 -1

2003

231. Somatoform disorders revisited. Acta Neuropsychiatrica 2003:15:161-166.

232. The Presidential WPA Program on child Mental Health. World Psychiatry Oct. 2003 pp. 129-130

233. WCA recommendations for the long term treatment of social phobia. CNS Spectr. Aug. 2003 pp. 40–52

234. WCA recommendations for the long term treatment of Generalized disorder. CNS Spectr. Aug. 2003 pp. 53-61

235. WCA recommendations for the long term treatment of posttraumatic st ress disorder. CNS Spectr. Aug. 2003 pp. 31–39

236. WCA recommendations for the long term treatment of obsessive compulsive disorder in adults. CNS Spectr. Aug. 2003 pp. 7–16

237. WCA recommendations for the long term treatment of panic disorder. CNS Spectr. Aug. 2003 pp. 17-30

238. The Declaration of Madrid and its implementations. An update. World Psychiatry. June 2003 pp. 65-67

239. Psychiatric Research in International Perspective: the Role of WPA. Acta Psychiatric Scand. Jan. 2003 pp. 81-84

240. WPA proposal regarding the escalation of violence in the Middle East. World Psychiatry Feb. 2003 pp. 1-2

2004

241. OCD in Egyptian Adolescents: The Effect of Culture and Religion. Psychiatric Times / April 2004 21-22.

242. Creativity & Transcultural Aspects in Bipolar Disorder: Read in Bipolar congress in Lisbon 2004.

243. Ethical Issues in Biological Psychiatry Research Read in WPA intersectional congress Athens 2004.

244. The Family differences between Western and Traditional Societies (ethics, Phenomenology and Outcome) The Italian Journal of Psychiatry and Behavioural Sciences. Dec. 2004 pp. 53-57

245. On the China Issue. world Psychiatry Oct. 2004 pp. 129

246. Years of Science and Care - Building the Future of 5000 psychiatry: the 13th World congress of Psychiatry. world Psychiatry June 2004 pp. 65

247. Mental Patients in Prisons: Punishment versus treatment. world Psychiatry 2004 Feb 2004 pp. 1-2

248. Focus on Psychiatry in Egypt. British Journal of Psychiatry Jan 2004 pp. 266-272

2005

249. Optimizing Quality of life of Psychotic Patients – Read in Psychiatic conference in Jordan 2005.

250. State of the Art in The Management Of Bipolar Disorder - Read in El Ain Emirates psychiatry 2005.

251. WPA Code of Ethics and Culture - Read at European Congress in Geneva 2005

252. Transcultural Aspect of Values and Partnership in Mental Health (Read at the XIIII World Congress of Psychiatry in Cairo - Egypt)

253. Evidence - Based Psychiatry (Read at the XIIII World Congress of Psychiatry in Cairo - Egypt)

254. Suicide and Islamic Cultures (Read at the XIIII World Congress of Psychiatry in Cairo - Egypt)

255. Transcultural Aspects of Values and Partnership in Mental Health (Read at the XIIII World Congress of Psychiatry in Cairo - Egypt)

256. AFFECTIVE DISORDER IN THE ARAB WORLD: A REVIEW OF EPIDEMIOLOGIC STUDIES (Read at the XIIII World Congress of Psychiatry in Cairo - Egypt)

257. OCD and the Cultural Prism (Read at the XIIII World Congress of Psychiatry in Cairo - Egypt)

258. Transcultural Aspects of Bipolar Disorder (Read at the XIIII World Congress of Psychiatry in Cairo - Egypt)

259. Diverse Cultures, Distinct Philosophies and a shared Vision for Mental Health. Impact of Arab culture/philosophy. (Read at the XIIII World Congress of Psychiatry in Cairo - Egypt)

260. Mental Disorders in Pharaonic Egypt . (Read at the XIIII World Congress of Psychiatry in Cairo - Egypt)

261. Mental Disorders and Care in Egyptian History From Pharaonic to Islamic Eras. (Read at the XIIII World Congress of Psychiatry in Cairo - Egypt).

262. Globalization and Mental Health: A WPA Perspective. World Psychiatry: Feb. (2005), Vol. 4(1):1-2.

263. The WPA Tsunami Programme. World Psychiatry: June. (2005), Vol.4(2):65

2006

264. WPA Ethics Committee World Psychiatric Association: Madrid Declaration of Ethical Standards in psychiatric practice. Psychiat Hung. Jan 2006, Vol. 21: 256: 261

265. The WPA Regional and Intersectional congress “Advances in Psychiatry” World Psychiatry: Feb (2006), Vol. 5: 65

266. The WPA Cairo Declaration. World Psychiatry: Feb. (2006), Vol. 5: 60

2007

267. Mental Health and Violence: WPA Cairo Declaration-International Perspectives for intervention. International Review of Psychiatry, June 2007; 19(3) 193-200.

268. Psychiatry And Political-Institutional Abuse From The Historical Perspective: The Ethical Lessons of The Nuremberg Trial on Their 60th Anniversary. Progress in Neuro-Psychopharmacotogy & Biological Psychiatry 31 (2007) 791-806

269. The Ethical Dilemma of Coercion in Psychiatry a Transcultural Aspec. BMC Psychiatry 2007, 7(Suppl 1):S3

2008

270. Introduction to the forum: Is Cannabis consumption a life style or brain disease? Current opinion in Psychiatry. Jan. 2008 Vol. 21. 114–115

271. World Psychiatric Association Pharmacopsyhcitry Section statement on comparative effectiveness of antipsychotics in the treatment of Schizophrenia. Elservier. Jan. 2008 20-38

272. Ethics for the Physician and Ethics in the management of the Terminally ill Patient. Egyptian Journal of Bronchology. Vol 2, No. ?, June 2008

2009

273. Would the Use of Dimensions instead of Categories Remove Problems Related to Subthreshold Disorders. European Archives of Psychiatry and Clinical Neuroscience. Vol. 259, Issue 2, p. 129, 2009

2011

274. Cross-cultural perspective on coercive treatment in psychiatry In Thomas W. Kallert, Juan E. Mezzich and John Monahan (eds): Coercive Treatment in Psychiatry; Clinical, legal and ethical aspects Wiley-Blackwell. pp. 153-159

275. New directions in classification of mental disorders: an Arab perspective,

Arab Journal of Psychiatry (2011) Vol. 22 No. 2 pp. 89-94

2012

276. Mental Health Services in the Arab World. World Psychiatry, 2012, 11; 52-54

277. Quality of Life and Personality Dimensions in Egyptian Substance Dependence

Patients. Addict Disord Their Treatment, 2012, (11) pp. 36-42

278. Religion, Spirituality and the concept of Mental Illness. Actas Esp Psiquiatr, 2012, 40

(Suppl. 2): pp. 73-9

279. Subsyndromal suicide: An Arab perspective in Suicide from a Global Perspective:

Psychosocial Approaches. Amresh Shrivastava, Megan Kimbrell and David Lester.

Nova Science publishers pp. 199-204

280. Mental health research in the Arab world, See comment in PubMed Commons below Soc Psychiatry Psychiatr Epidemiol. 2012

Nov. 47(11): pp. 1727-31.

2017

281. Arab Treatment Guidelines for the Management of Major Depressive Disorder,

Arab Journal of Psychiatry, Vol. 28 No. 2 pp. 97-117

282. Psychoanalysis of Zionism in the Context of History and Circumstances, The Arab

Journal of Psychiatry, Vol. 28 No. 2 pp. 181–186

283. A Critical Review of the Literature: Safety, Tolerability and Risks Associated with Newer

Generation Antidepressant Drugs, Arab Journal of Psychiatry, Vol. 28 No. 2, pp. 5-9

284. Safety and Tolerability of Antipsychoticsm Arab Journal of Psychiatry, in press

Academic offices
Preceded by Juan José López-Ibor Aliño	President of World Psychiatric Association; 2002–2005	Succeeded by Juan Mezzich
