= Norman Sartorius =

German-Croatian psychiatrist and university professor

- Born: 28/1/1935; Germany
- Education: School of Medicine, University of Zagreb, MD
- Occupations: Psychiatrist, psychologist, medical educator, public health specialist
- Children: One daughter, Danielle

Norman Sartorius (born 1935) is a German-Croatian psychiatrist and university professor. Sartorius is a former director of the World Health Organization's (WHO) Division of Mental Health, and a former president of the World Psychiatric Association and of the European Psychiatric Association. He has been described as "one of the most prominent and influential psychiatrists of his generation" and as a "living legend".

== Biography ==
Sartorius was born in Münster, Germany but grew up in Koprivnica and Zagreb, Croatia raised by his mother, Professor Feđa Fischer-Sartorius, a renowned pediatrician. Sartorius obtained his M.D. from the School of Medicine, University of Zagreb in 1958, and his B.Sc. and M.A. in psychology from the Faculty of Humanities and Social Sciences, University of Zagreb in 1962. He finished his specialization in psychiatry and neurology in 1963 and defended his Ph.D. thesis in psychology at the University of Zagreb in 1965. After obtaining his Ph.D., and passing the speciality examinations for Neurology and Psychiatry Sartorius spent two years at the University of London on a British Council stipend.

In 1967, Sartorius was invited to join the WHO. and became the Head of the WHO Interregional Advisory Team on Epidemiology of Mental Disorders. He then took the position of Medical Officer responsible for epidemiological and social psychiatry and in 1974 at WHO Headquarters became the Chief of the Mental Health Unit. In 1977 he was appointed Director of the Division of Mental Health of WHO, a position which he held until 1993. He served as the President of the World Psychiatric Association (1993–1999) and of the European Psychiatric Association (1997–2001).

Sartorius became a professor at the University of Geneva in 1993. Sartorius also held professorships at the University of Zagreb and University of Prague. He has worked as an honorary visiting or adjunct professor at the University of London, Pierre and Marie Curie University in Paris, the University of Beijing, Washington University in St. Louis, the New York University, the University of Belgrade and the University of Florida. He is a senior faculty member at the Johns Hopkins School of Public Health in the Mental Health Department.

Sartorius is a Fellow of the British Royal Society of Medicine, Honorary Fellow European Association of Social Psychiatry, member of Medical Academies in Croatia, Mexico and Peru, and a corresponding member of the Royal Academy of Medicine of Spain and of the Croatian Academy of Arts and sciences, Honoris causa Doctor of Medicine of the Umeå University, of the Timișoara/Temisvar University Victor Babes and of the Charles University in Prague. He is also an Honorary Doctor of Science of the University of Bath in 1990, the University of Florida (2015) and an honorary doctor of psychology of the University of Copenhagen. He is a Distinguished Fellow of the American Psychiatric Association, an Honorary Fellow of the Royal College of Psychiatrists of the United Kingdom, of the Royal Australian and New Zealand College of Psychiatrists, of the European Psychiatric Association and of the World Psychiatric Association. He is a Fellow or an honorary member of numerous other professional organizations.

=== Scientific work ===
Sartorius' work dealt with epidemiology of mental disorders and social psychiatry with public health matters as well as with various issues related to schizophrenia, depression, and health service delivery. Major themes in his current work and public activity are rights of patients with mental disorders and struggle against stigma and prejudices associated with mental illness, comorbidity of mental and physical illness education in psychiatry and improvement of mental health services. He has conducted more than 150 Leadership and Professional Skills courses involving more than 2000 early career psychiatrists from more than 60 countries.

Between 1961 and 2022, Sartorius published more than 500 papers in peer reviewed journals and more than 800 technical contributions, prefaces to books, interviews and brief articles. According to the Web of Science, Sartorius' articles have been cited more than 47.000 times, and his h-index is 110. He has authored, co-authored or edited more than 120 books.

=== Awards ===
- 1980 Rema Lapouse Award
- 2002 Harvard Award in Psychiatric Epidemiology and Statistics
- 2003 Burgholzli award for Clinical and Social Psychiatry
- 2005 Prince Mahidol Award in Medicine
- 2007 GAMIAN European Personality Award
- 2012 Eli Lilly Welcome Back Award
- 2014 Lifetime Achievement Award from the Royal College of Psychiatrists
- 2014 Lifetime Achievement Award and Zirovcic medal by the Croatian Psychiatric Society
- 2016 Wilhelm-Griesinger Prize from the German Association for Psychiatry, Psychotherapy and Psychosomatics
- 2017 Lifetime Achievement Award, Asian Federation of Psychiatric Associations

=== Personal life ===
Sartorius currently lives in Geneva and Zagreb with his wife Vera. They have been married since 1963 and have a daughter.
