= American Health Line =

American Health Line is a daily health care policy briefing which "covers the coverage". It is published by the Advisory Board Company from its headquarters in Washington, DC. It was previously under the auspices of National Journal.

American Health Line's primary audience includes health care professionals. It intends to be a comprehensive, non-partisan digest of that day's health care events relating to policy and industry.

Related publications of American Health Line include California Healthline, iHealthBeat, Kaiser Daily Health Policy Report, Kaiser Daily HIV/AIDS Report, Kaiser Weekly Health Disparities Report, Greater Cincinnati Health Watch and Global Health Reporting.
