= Mario Maj =

Italian psychiatrist and professor

Mario Maj is an Italian psychiatrist and professor who has been President of the World Psychiatric Association (2008–2011) and of the European Psychiatric Association (2003–2004). He is the founder and Editor of World Psychiatry, the official journal of the World Psychiatric Association, one of the most established psychiatry-themed journals, with a 2022 impact factor of 73.3.

Maj has been Chairperson of the Working Group on Mood and Anxiety Disorders and member of the International Advisory Board for the chapter on mental disorders of the International Classification of Diseases, 11th edition (ICD-11), and has been member of the Work Group on Mood Disorders for the American Psychiatric Association’s Diagnostic and Statistical Manual of Mental Disorders, 5th edition (DSM-5).

As a researcher, Maj is especially known for his contributions in the area of bipolar disorder, including the clinical characterization of rapid cycling, mixed states, and psychotic depression, and the study of the determinants of response to prophylaxis with lithium salts.

He has also produced widely quoted editorials on the concept of psychiatric comorbidity, conflicts of interests in psychiatry, and DSM-5 operational diagnostic criteria for schizophrenia.
