= Payne Whitney Psychiatric Clinic =

Hospital in New York City

Coordinates: 40°45′50″N 73°57′13″W

The Payne Whitney Psychiatric Clinic (PWC) was a hospital on the Upper East Side of Manhattan, New York City, United States. It was founded by an endowment bestowed by Payne Whitney (March 20, 1876 – May 25, 1927) upon his death. Whitney was an American businessman and member of the Whitney family. An eight-story free-standing hospital was constructed, and was affiliated with Cornell University's medical school, now called Weill Cornell Medicine, and with New York Hospital, now New York–Presbyterian Hospital (NYP), before its opening.

Payne Whitney was a large donor to the Hospital and Medical College, and it has been an issue of long speculation why he chose a psychiatric building to be his primary naming opportunity at New York-Cornell.

The Payne Whitney building itself was torn down in the early 1990s to make way for an expansion of the New York-Presbyterian Hospital over the FDR Drive. Since that time, all clinical and research services at the two primary Cornell psychiatric campuses—in Manhattan and in White Plains, New York—have been named after Payne Whitney. The clinic also has an outpatient and Continuing Day Treatment Program in an off-campus building at East 61st Street and York Avenue on the Upper East Side.

== Notable people ==
Payne Whitney Clinic and NYP / Weill Cornell have been home to some of the most notable psychiatrists in the country. Current psychiatrists and psychologists include Jack Barchas, Robert Michels, Otto F. Kernberg, James Kocsis, George Makari, Michael Posner, William Breitbart, and Theodore Shapiro.

Noted staff have included Arnold Cooper, Frederic Flach, Benjamin Spock, Gerald Klerman, Robert Millman, Louis Jolyon West, David Silbersweig, Harry Tiebout, Mary Jane Sherfey, Helen Singer Kaplan, Allen Frances, and Paul McHugh. Payne Whitney has also been the "voluntary faculty" home to Roy Schafer, Richard Isay, Michael Perelman, Gail Saltz, and Daniel Stern, and the recent home of such senior scholars as David A. Hamburg and Beatrix Hamburg.

== In media ==
The poet Robert Lowell wrote of his hospitalization at Payne Whitney, Marilyn Monroe was hospitalized there in early 1961, and Mary McCarthy based her book, The Group, on her inpatient experience. The poet James Schuyler wrote about his experiences there in the eleven-poem series "The Payne Whitney Poems" which appeared in the New York Review of Books, August 17, 1978, issue. In Woody Allen's 1979 film, Manhattan, a character named Caroline Payne Whitney Smith is featured in a comedy sketch, where she and her husband are considered "normal folks," except for the fact that she is a catatonic. Allen's 2003 film Anything Else also references Payne Whitney: The character he plays, David Dobel, claims to have spent time there. Lou Reed sings "Creedmoor treated me very good but Payne Whitney was even better" in his 1974 song "Kill Your Sons."

== See also ==
- Bloomingdale Insane Asylum (1821–1889)
- NewYork-Presbyterian Westchester Behavioral Health Center
