= Michael Perelman =

Michael Perelman may refer to:

- Michael Perelman (economist) (born 1939), American economist and economic historian
- Michael Perelman (psychologist), American psychologist
