= Cyrus Hamlin =

Cyrus Hamlin may refer to:

- Cyrus Hamlin (general) (1839–1867), American attorney, politician, and Civil War general
- Cyrus Hamlin (missionary) (1811–1900), American Congregational missionary and co-founder of Robert College
- Cyrus Hamlin (professor) (1936–2011), American professor, descendant of the general
