= Arnold Cooper =

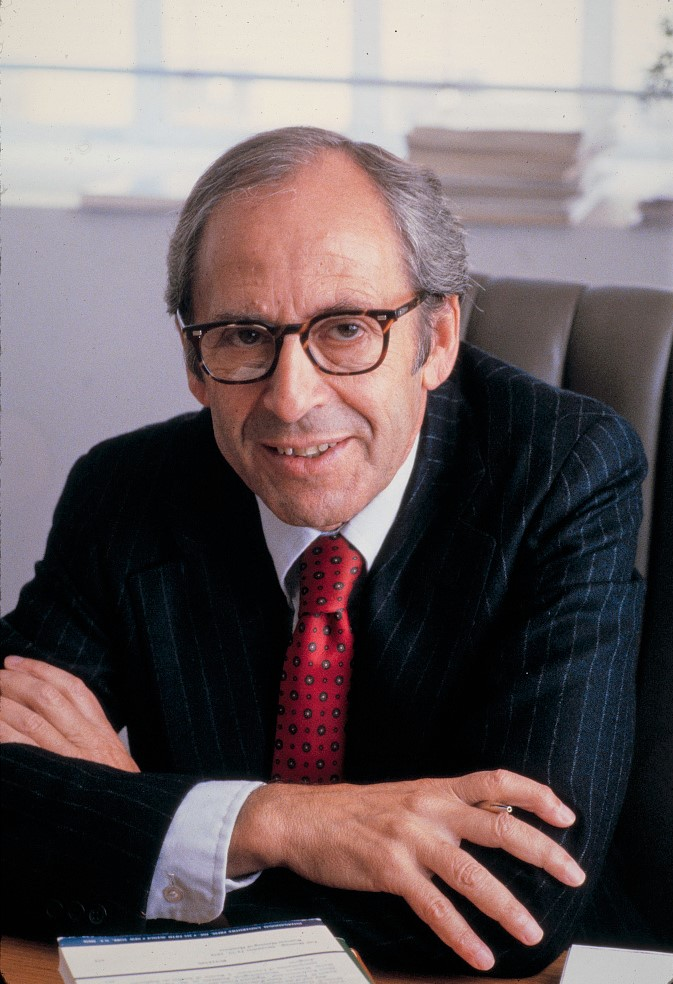
Cooper, circa 1980.

Arnold Cooper (March 9, 1923 – 2011)) was the Tobin-Cooper Professor Emeritus in Consultation-Liaison psychiatry at the Weill Cornell Medical College and the Payne Whitney Psychiatric Clinic. He was a supervising and training analyst at the Columbia University Center for Psychoanalytic Training and Research. He died in June 2011.

Cooper is known within the psychoanalytic community for his elaborations on the interrelatedness of narcissism and masochism. Between 1974 and 1994, he was the Vice Chair for Education and the Residency Training Director for the department of psychiatry at Cornell. He was a President of the American Psychoanalytic Association. He was a graduate of Columbia University and the University of Utah School of Medicine.

A collection of Cooper's essays, The Quiet Revolution in American Psychoanalysis, was published in 2005.
