= Robert Michels (physician) =

American physician and psychoanalyst

Robert Michels (born 1936) is a Professor of Medicine and of Psychiatry at Weill Cornell Medical College and a training and supervising psychoanalyst at the Columbia University Center for Psychoanalytic Training and Research.

A native of Chicago, Michels graduated from the University of Chicago and Northwestern University's medical school. After a residency and psychoanalytic training at Columbia, Michels completed a fellowship at the National Institutes of Health. Michels was named chairman of Cornell's psychiatry department in 1974. He served seventeen years as chairman at the Payne Whitney Psychiatric Clinic and served as Dean of Cornell's medical school from 1991 to 1996. Michels has been a Fellow of The Hastings Center since 1970.

He is the author of many articles and has co-edited multiple texts. His best known work is The Psychiatric Interview in Clinical Practice, which was written with Roger MacKinnon and published in 1971. A second edition was published in 2006.
