= Manuscript Society (Yale University) =

Yale University senior society

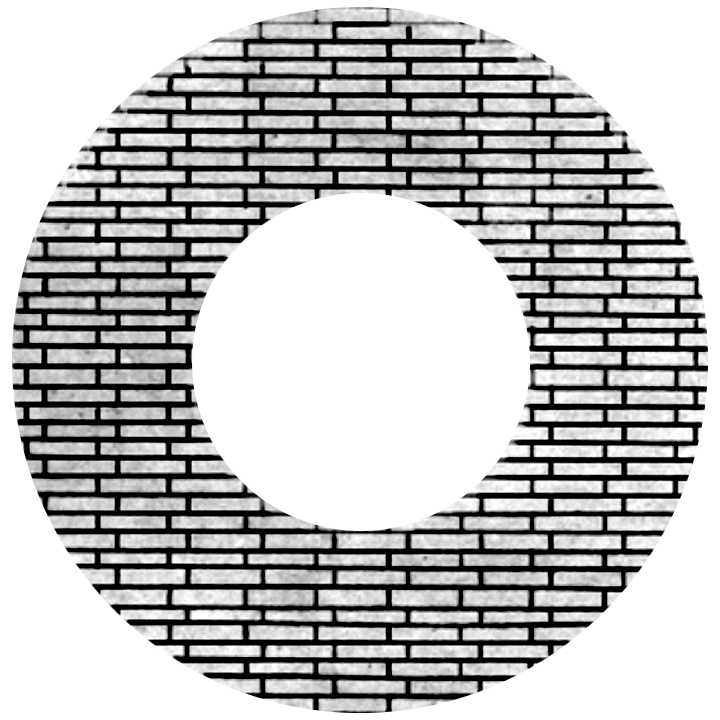
- Founded: 1951; 75 years ago Yale University
- Type: Senior society
- Affiliation: Independent
- Status: Active
- Emphasis: Senior - Arts and letters
- Scope: Local
- Symbol: Sun
- Flower: Sunflower
- Chapters: 1
- Nickname: Manuscript
- Headquarters: 344 Elm Street; New Haven, Connecticut; United States

Manuscript Society is a senior society at Yale University in New Haven, Connecticut. It is reputedly the arts and letters society at Yale.

== History ==
Founded in 1951, Manuscript was Yale's seventh "landed" senior society - that is, its alumni trust owns the society's meeting place or "tomb". The Manuscript Society was one of the first senior societies to offer membership to rising females at Yale College.

Each delegation is selected by consensus among Manuscript alumni, trustees, delegates, and significant others, unlike other Yale societies where undergraduate members more freely select, recruit, and initiate their society's next delegation.

The Wrexham Foundation is the society's alumni arm. Since 1956, the foundation has underwritten the Wrexam Prize, a scholarship in the humanities for the senior who writes the best essay in the field of the humanities.

Manuscript briefly played host to the 1991-92 classes of Skull and Bones, who were temporarily locked out of their tomb by alumni who objected to its undergraduates' decision to offer membership to women. From its beginning the society also retained close connections with the campus literary society Chi Delta Theta, which formed in 1821.

Manuscript Society is part of a four-society "Consortium" with the Aurelian Honor Society, Book and Snake, and Berzelius.

== Traditions ==
The society holds the number 344 to be sacred. It supposedly holds Enlightenment ideals, and the sun and sunflowers are both important symbols to members.

The society holds an annual gathering in its tomb on Halloween. Its members also invite guests to events featuring notable alumni.

== Chapter house ==
Designed by King-lui Wu, Manuscript's white granite tomb was built in 1952. The tomb is mid-century modern, unusual amid other societies' elaborate mid-to-late-19th century buildings. It featured a circular intaglio mural in white-glazed brick that was designed by Josef Albers. The circle, which is only visible in direct sunlight, symbolizes the bond connecting the members.

It appears from the outside to have only one level, yet conceals several subterranean floors and a courtyard. The tomb holds a collection of notable modern and contemporary art. The Yale University Art Gallery is said to have temporarily stored pieces there. Wu said that he designed the building "for privacy, not for secrecy." Dan Kiley designed the landscaping which includes a Japanese water garden.

== Popular culture ==
Manuscript is described in the novel Joe College by Tom Perrotta as "basically the cool people's version of a secret society".

Leigh Bardugo’s dark academia fantasy novel Ninth House features an occult version of the society that specializes in mirror magic, illusions, and glamouring.

== Notable members ==
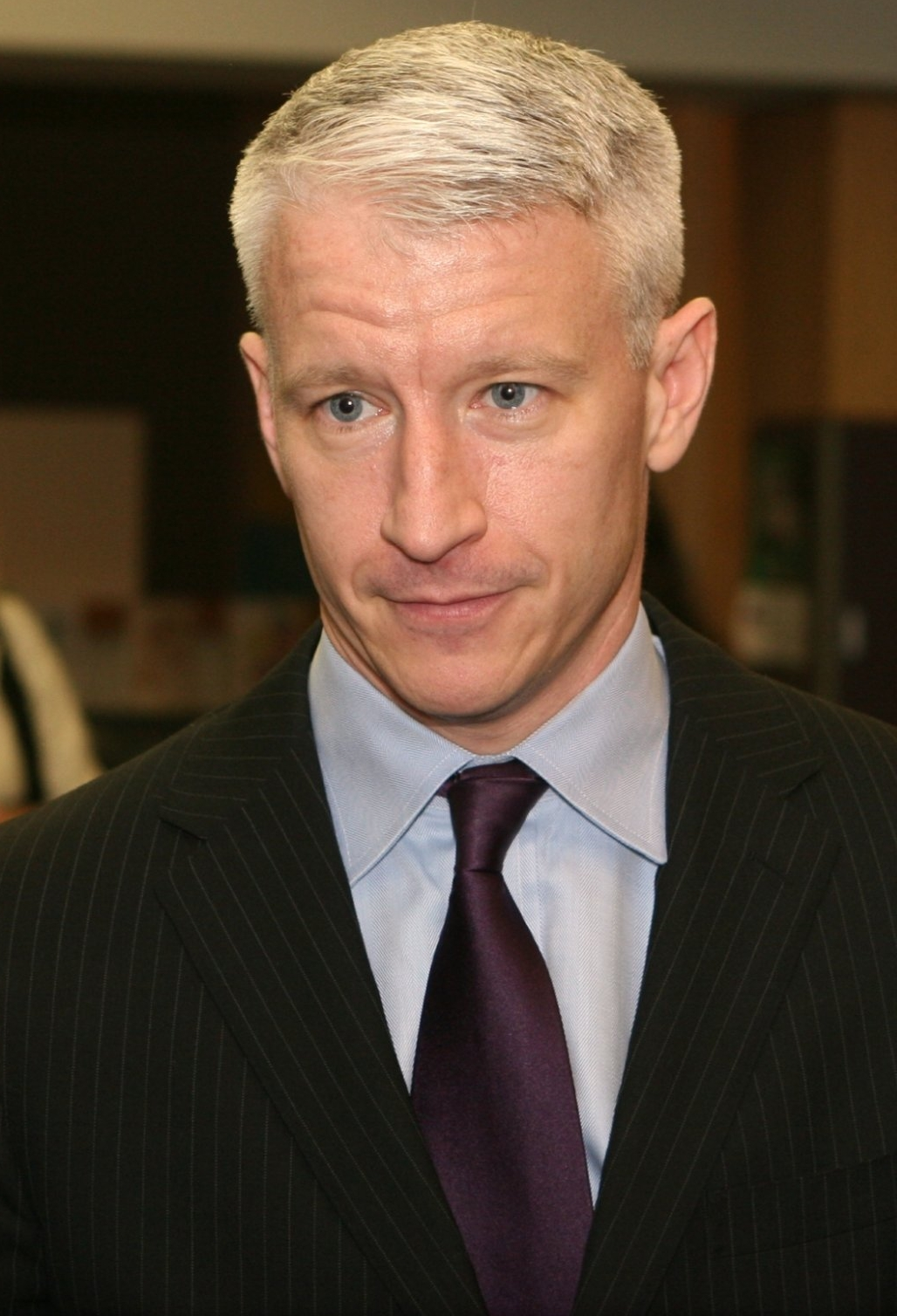
Anderson Cooper

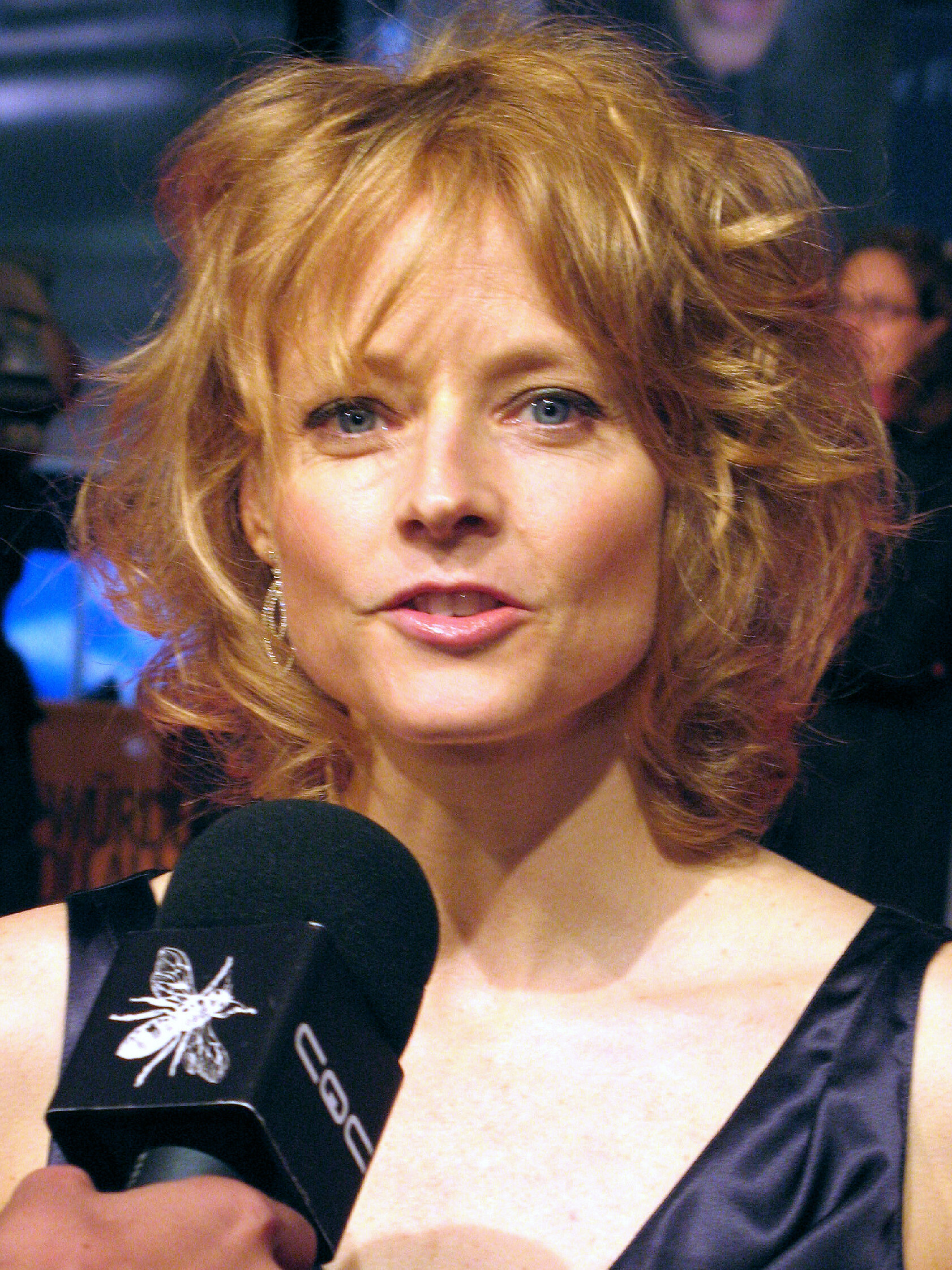
Jodie Foster

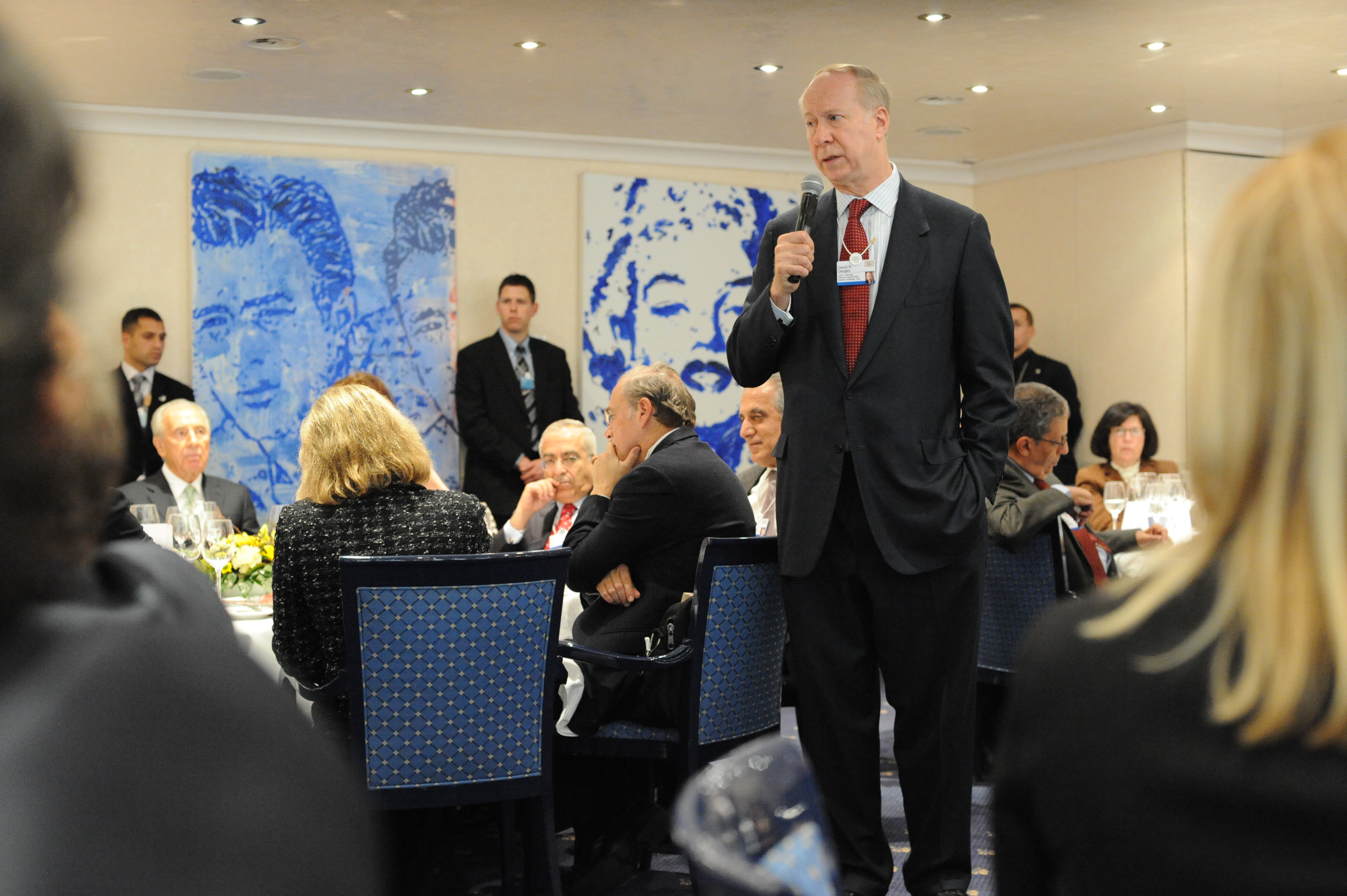
David Gergen

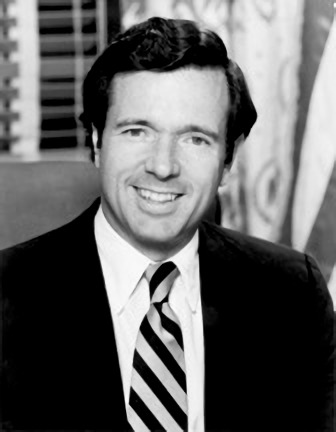
H. John Heinz III

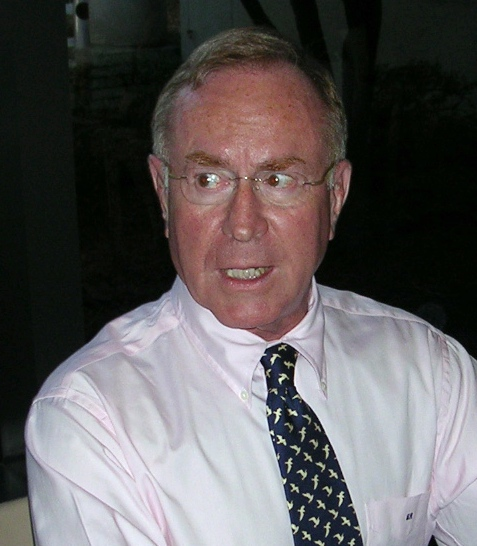
Richard Rhodes

Name	Class	Notability	References
Josef Albers	Honorary	Artist	
Jen Banbury	1989	Playwright, author, and journalist	
Alan Bernheimer	1970	Poet	
Noah Bookbinder	1995	Professor of law at George Washington University	
Maia Brewton	1998	Child actress and lawyer	
Richard H. Brodhead	1968	9th President of Duke University	
Cleanth Brooks	Honorary	Literary critic	
Matthew Bruccoli	1953	F. Scott Fitzgerald scholar	
David Calleo	1955	Intellectual historian, political economist at Paul H. Nitze School of Advanced International Studies at Johns Hopkins University	
Anderson Cooper	1989	Journalist and news anchor with CNN	
Robert A. Dahl	Honorary	Professor of political science at Yale University	
Eli Whitney Debevoise II	1974	U.S. Director of the World Bank	
Charles Derber	1965	Professor of sociology and social critic	
Juan Negrín Fetter	1967	Director of Wixarika Research Center	
Robert Fiore	1964	Film producer and director	
Jodie Foster	1985	Director and Academy Award winning actress	
Henry Geldzahler	1957	Art historian and curator	
Tamar Gendler	1987	Professor, chair of the Yale University department of philosophy	
David Gergen	1963	Presidential advisor and political commentator	
Robert Glick	1962	Director of the Columbia University Center for Psychoanalytic Training and Research	
Cyrus Hamlin	Honorary	Literary critic and longtime Yale professor	
E. D. Hirsch, Jr.	Honorary	Literary critic and proponent of cultural literacy	
H. John Heinz III	1960	U.S. Senator	
Cheryl Henson	1984	Puppeteer and president of the Jim Henson Foundation	
Rodger Kamenetz	1970	Professor and certified dream therapist	
Zoe Kazan	2005	Actor and playwright	
Byron Kim	1983	Minimalist artist	
Anthony Lapham	1958	General Counsel of the CIA from 1976–1979 and Chair of the American Rivers	
Brooke Lyons	2003	Actor	
Jane Maienschein	1972	Director of the Center for Biology and Society, at Arizona State University	
Richard Maltby, Jr.	1959	Tony Award-winning director	
Patrick McCaughey	Honorary	Former director of the Yale Center for British Art	
Ved Mehta	Honorary	Author and advocate for the blind	
Ted Morgan	1954	Pulitzer Prize-winning author and journalist	
Wallace Notestein	Honorary	Sterling Professor of English History at Yale	
Soni Oyekan	1970	Chemical engineer and inventor	
Michael Pertschuk	1954	Consumer advocate, author and former government official	
Scott Peterson	1988	Author and journalist	
James Prosek	1997	Author and naturalist	
Dale Purves	1960	Neuroscientist, director of Neuroscience and Behavioural Disorders at Duke	
Richard Rhodes	1959	Pulitzer Prize-winning author	
Duncan Robinson	Honorary	Master of Magdalene College and Director of the Fitzwilliam Museum	
Richard Selzer	Honorary	Surgeon, author, and professor of surgery at Yale	
William Kelly Simpson	Honorary	Art historian and head of college of Timothy Dwight College	
Steven Smith	Honorary	Political scientist and head of college of Branford College	
Paul Steiger	1964	Editor-in-Chief of ProPublica, former managing editor of the Wall Street Journal	
Robert Storr	Honorary	Curator, critic, painter, and writer.	
Robert Farris Thompson	Honorary	Art historian and master of Timothy Dwight College	
Rosanna Warren	1976	Poet and scholar	
Elisabeth Waterston	1999	Actor	
Stephen F. Williams	1958	Senior Circuit Judge on the U.S. Court of Appeals for the District of Columbia Circuit	
Jonathan Zittrain	1991	Professor of Internet Law at Harvard University	
Karl Zinsmeister	1981	Director of the White House Domestic Policy Council under George W. Bush	

== See also ==
- Collegiate secret societies in North America

== Sources ==
- Robbins, Alexandra. Secrets of the Tomb: Skull and Bones, the Ivy League, and the Hidden Paths of Power. (Back Bay Books: 2003). ISBN 0-316-73561-2
