= Talking cure =

Form of verbal therapy

The Talking Cure and chimney sweeping were terms Bertha Pappenheim, known in case studies by the alias Anna O., used for the verbal therapy she engaged in under her physician, Josef Breuer. The case study of her treatment was first published in Studies on Hysteria (1895).

As Ernest Jones put it, "On one occasion she related the details of the first appearance of a particular symptom and, to Breuer's great astonishment, this resulted in its complete disappearance," or in Lacan's words, "the more Anna provided signifiers, the more she chattered on, the better it went".

== Development ==
=== Invention of the term ===
Breuer found that Pappenheim's symptoms—headaches, excitement, curious vision disturbances, partial paralyses, and loss of sensation, which had no organic origin and are now called somatoform disorders—improved once the subject expressed her repressed trauma and related emotions, a process later called catharsis. Peter Gay considered that, "Breuer rightly claimed a quarter of a century later that his treatment of Bertha Pappenheim contained 'the germ cell of the whole of psychoanalysis'."

Sigmund Freud later adopted the term talking cure to describe the fundamental work of psychoanalysis. He himself referenced Breuer and Anna O. in his Lectures on Psychoanalysis at Clark University, Worcester, MA, in September 1909: "The patient herself, who, strange to say, could at this time only speak and understand English, christened this novel kind of treatment the 'talking cure' or used to refer to it jokingly as 'chimney-sweeping'."

=== Locus classicus ===
There are currently three English translations of Studies on Hysteria, the first by A. A. Brill (1937), the second by James Strachey (1955), included in the Standard Edition, and the third by Nicola Luckhurst (2004). The following samples come from Breuer’s case study on “Anna O...” where the concept of talking cure appears for the first time and illustrate how the translations differ:

1937 edition	1955 edition	2004 edition
In the country, where I could not see the patient daily, the situation developed in the following manner: I came in the evening when I knew that she was in a state of hypnosis, and I took away from her the whole supply of fantasms which she had collected since my last visit. In order to obtain good results this had to be accomplished very thoroughly. Following this, she was quite tranquil and the next day she was very pleasant, docile, industrious and cheerful. The following day she was always more moody, peevish, and unpleasant; all of which became more marked on the third day. In this state of mind it was not always easy even in hypnosis to induce her to express herself, for which procedure she invented the good and serious name of “talking-cure,” and humorously referred to it as “chimney-sweeping.” She knew that after expressing herself, she would lose all her peevishness and “energy,” yet whenever (after a long pause) she was in an angry mood she refused to talk, so that I had to extort it from her through urging and begging, as well as through some tricks, such as reciting to her a stereotyped introductory formula of her stories. But she never spoke until after she had carefully touched my hands and had become convinced of my identity. During the nights when rest could not be obtained through expression, one had to make use of chloral. I tried this a number of times before, but I had to give her 5 grams per dose, and sleep was preceded by a sort of intoxication, which lasted an hour. In my presence she was cheerful, but when I was away, there appeared a most uncomfortable, anxious state of excitement (incidentally, the deep intoxication just mentioned made no change in the contractures). I could have omitted the narcotic because the talking, if it did not bring sleep, at least produced calm. In the country, however, the nights were so intolerable between the hypnotic alleviations, that we had to resort to chloral. Gradually, however, she did not need so much of it.	While she was in the country, when I was unable to pay her daily visits, the situation developed as follows. I used to visit her in the evening, when I knew I should find her in her hypnosis, and I then relieved her of the whole stock of imaginative products which she had accumulated since my last visit. It was essential that this should be effected completely if good results were to follow. When this was done she became perfectly calm, and next day she would be agreeable, easy to manage, industrious and even cheerful; but on the second day she would be increasingly moody, contrary and unpleasant, and this would become still more marked on the third day. When she was like this it was not always easy to get her to talk, even in her hypnosis. She aptly described this procedure, speaking seriously, as a ‘talking cure’, while she referred to it jokingly as ‘chimney-sweeping’.^{1} She knew that after she had given utterance to her hallucinations she would lose all her obstinacy and what she described as her ‘energy’; and when, after some comparatively long interval, she was in a bad temper, she would refuse to talk, and I was obliged to overcome her unwillingness by urging and pleading and using devices such as repeating a formula with which she was in the habit of introducing her stories. But she would never begin to talk until she had satisfied herself of my identity by carefully feeling my hands. On those nights on which she had not been calmed by verbal utterance it was necessary to fall back upon chloral. I had tried it on a few earlier occasions, but I was obliged to give her 5 grammes, and sleep was preceded by a state of intoxication which lasted for some hours. When I was present this state was euphoric, but in my absence it was highly disagreeable and characterized by anxiety as well as excitement. (It may be remarked incidentally that this severe state of intoxication made no difference to her contractures.) I had been able to avoid the use of narcotics, since the verbal utterance of her hallucinations calmed her even though it might not induce sleep; but when she was in the country the nights on which she had not obtained hypnotic relief were so unbearable that in spite of everything it was necessary to have recourse to chloral. But it became possible gradually to reduce the dose. —————————^{1} [These two phrases are in English in the original.]	While the patient was in the country, where I was unable to visit her every day, the situation developed as follows. I came in the evening, when I knew that she would be in her hypnosis, and removed the entire stock of phantasms that she had amassed since my last visit. For this to be successful, there could be no omissions. Then she would become quite calm and on the following day was agreeable, obedient, industrious, and even in good spirits. But on the second day she was increasingly moody, contrary and disagreeable, and this worsened on the third. Once she was in this temper it was not always easy, even in her hypnosis, to get her to talk things through, a procedure for which she had found two names in English, the apt and serious ‘talking cure’ and the humorous ‘chimney-sweeping’. She knew that having spoken out she would lose all her contrariness and ‘energy’. If, after a comparatively long break, she was already in a bad mood, she would refuse to talk, and I had to wrest it from her, with demands, pleas and a few tricks such as reciting one of the phrases with which she would typically begin her stories. But she would never speak until she had made sure of my identity by carefully feeling my hands. During those nights when talking things through had not calmed her, it was necessary to resort to chloral. I had tried this on a few previous occasions, but found it necessary to give her 5 grams, and sleep was then preceded by a state of intoxication lasting several hours. Whenever I was present, this state was bright and cheerful, but, in my absence, it took the form of an anxious and extremely unpleasant excitement. (The contracture was completely unaffected by this state of severe intoxication.) I had been able to avoid the narcotic, because the talking through at the very least calmed her down, even if it did not also allow her to sleep. But while she was living in the country the nights between those in which she was relieved by hypnosis were so unbearable that it was necessary to resort to chloral; gradually, however, she needed to take less of it.

== Current status ==
Mental health professionals now use the term talking cure more widely to mean any of a variety of talking therapies. Some consider that after a century of employment the talking cure has finally led to the writing cure.

The Talking Cure: The science behind psychotherapy is also the name of a book published by Holt and authored by Susan C. Vaughan MD in 1997. It explores the way in which psychotherapy reshapes the through incorporating neuroscience research with psychotherapy research and research on development. It contains clinical vignettes of the "talking cure" in action from real psychotherapies.

== Celebrity endorsement ==
The actress Diane Keaton attributes her recovery from bulimia to the talking cure: "All those disjointed words and half-sentences, all those complaining, awkward phrases...made the difference. It was the talking cure; the talking cure that gave me a way out of addiction; the damn talking cure."

== See also ==
- Psychotherapy
