= Susan Coates =

American psychologist (born 1940)

- Born: 1940 (age 85–86)
- Occupations: Psychoanalyst; professor

Susan W. Coates (born 1940) is an American psychoanalyst, who has worked on gender dysphoria in children and early childhood trauma.

== Career ==
=== Overview ===
Coates was Director of the Childhood Gender Identity Service at St. Luke's–Roosevelt Hospital Center from 1980 to 1997. In 1997, Coates was founding co-director of the Parent-Infant Program at the Columbia University Center for Psychoanalytic Training and Research.

Coates is on the teaching faculty as a Clinical Professor of Medical Psychology in Psychiatry at the Columbia University Center for Psychoanalytic Training and Research. Coates is also on the faculty of the Columbia University Department of Psychiatry.

After the September 11, 2001, attacks, Coates provided mental health services to children and their parents at the Family Assistance Center set up by Disaster Psychiatry Outreach at Pier 94 in New York City.

=== Work on gender dysphoria ===
Coates was among a small number of psychiatrists and psychologists who were instrumental in establishing a pathologizing and reparative approach to childhood gender non-conformity. Coates considered gender non-conforming children to be suffering from a severe mental disorder. Coates and Kenneth Zucker described the mothers of feminine boys as being overbearing, and transferring unresolved psychological trauma to their children. Coates described the mothers as anxious, controlling, and intrusive. In this psychoanalytic model, the child experiences separation anxiety, and creates a fantasy of reuniting with the mother who was physically or emotionally absent. These ideas echoed early theories on homosexuality that blamed mothers for the gender non-conformity of their children.

Coates served on the American Psychiatric Association DSM-IV Subcommittee on Gender Identity Disorders.

=== Role in Woody Allen custody trial ===
Coates provided therapy to Ronan Farrow between 1990 and 1992. In 1993, in relation to the Woody Allen sexual abuse allegation, Coates testified in court that the behavior of Mia Farrow had become increasingly erratic.

== Selected publications ==
- Coates SW (1985). "Extreme boyhood femininity: Overview and new research findings". In Corn R, DeFries Z, Friedman RC (eds.). Sexuality: New perspectives. Greenwood Press. ISBN 978-0-313-24207-6.
- Coates SW, Person ES (November 1985). "Extreme Boyhood Femininity: Isolated Behavior or Pervasive Disorder?". J Am Acad Child Psychiatry. 24 (6): 702–709. doi:10.1016/S0002-7138(10)60113-6. PMID 4067139.
- Coates SW (1990). "Ontogenesis of Boyhood Gender Identity Disorder". J. Amer. Acad. Psychoanal. 18 (3): 414–438. doi:10.1521/jaap.1.1990.18.3.414. PMID 2258315.
- Coates SW, Friedman RC, Wolfe S (1991). "The Etiology of Boyhood Gender Identity Disorder: A Model for Integrating Temperament, Development, and Psychodynamics". Psychoanal. Dial. 1 (4): 481–523. doi:10.1080/10481889109538916.
- Zucker KJ, Green R, Coates S, Zuger B, Cohen-Kettenis PT, Zecca GM, et al. (July 1997). "Sibling sex ratio of boys with gender identity disorder". J Child Psychol Psychiatry. 38 (5): 543–551. doi:10.1111/j.1469-7610.1997.tb01541.x. PMID 9255698.
- Coates SW, Wolfe SM (1995). "Boyhood Gender Identity Disorder: The interface of constitution and early experience". Psychoanalytic Inquiry. 51: 6–38. doi:10.1080/07351699509534015.
- Coates SW, Moore MS (1997). "The complexity of early trauma: Representation and transformation". Psychoanalytic Inquiry. 17 (3): 286–311. doi:10.1080/07351699709534128.
- Coates SW, Rosenthal J, Schechter DS, eds. (2003). September 11: Trauma and Human Bonds. Hillside, NJ: The Analytic Press. ISBN 0-88163-381-X.
- Coates S, Schechter D (2004). "Preschoolers' Traumatic Stress Post-9/11: Relational and Developmental Perspectives". Psychiatric Clinics of North America. 27 (3): 473–489. doi:10.1016/j.psc.2004.03.006. PMID 15325488.
- Coates SW (2005). "Having a Mind of One's Own and Holding the Other in Mind: Commentary on Paper by Peter Fonagy and Mary Target". Psychoanalytics Dialogues. 8 (1): 115–148. doi:10.1080/10481889809539236.
- Coates SW, Gaensbauer TJ (2009). "Event Trauma in Early Childhood: Symptoms, Assessment, Intervention". Child and Adolescent Psychiatric Clinics of North America. 18 (3): 611–626. doi:10.1016/j.chc.2009.03.005. PMID 19486841. (Erratum: doi:10.1016/j.chc.2009.06.001)
