= Tantrum =

Type of anger outburst engaged in typically by young children

Child having a tantrum

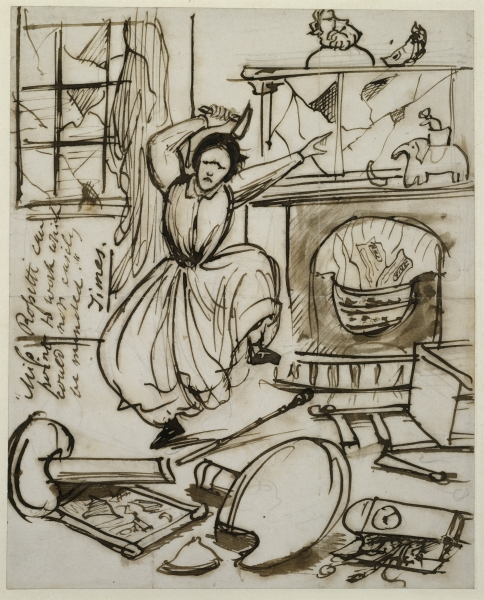
"Christina Rossetti in a Tantrum" by her brother, Dante Gabriel Rossetti

A tantrum, conniption, angry outburst, temper tantrum, lash out, fit of anger, or hissy fit is an emotional outburst, usually associated with children or those in emotional distress. It is typically characterized by stubbornness, crying, screaming, violence, defiance, angry ranting and being naughty, a resistance to attempts at pacification, and in some cases, hitting or bullying and other physically violent behavior. Physical control may be lost; the person may be unable to remain still; and even if the "goal" of the person is met, they may not be calmed.

A tantrum may be expressed in a tirade: a protracted, angry speech.

Throwing a temper tantrum by a child may lead to a punishment: getting detention or being suspended from school for older school-age children, and could result in a timeout or grounding, complete with timeout (room or corner time), at home.

== In early childhood ==
Tantrums are one of the most common forms of problematic behavior in young children but tend to decrease in frequency and intensity as the child gets older. For a toddler, tantrums can be considered as normal, and even as gauges of developing strength of character.

While tantrums are sometimes seen as a predictor of future anti-social behavior, in another sense they are simply an age-appropriate sign of excessive frustration, and will diminish over time given a calm and consistent handling. Parental containment where a child cannot contain themself—rather than what the child is ostensibly demanding—may be what is really required.

Selma Fraiberg warned against "too much pressure or forceful methods of control from the outside" in child-rearing: "if we turn every instance of pants changing, treasure hunting, napping, puddle wading and garbage distribution into a governmental crisis we can easily bring on fierce defiance, tantrums, and all the fireworks of revolt in the nursery".

== Intellectual and developmental disorders ==
Anyone may be prone to tantrums once in a while, regardless of gender or age, however tantrums may be more frequent in people with an intellectual disability or experiencing brain damage (temporary or permanent).

== Meltdowns ==
While the outward behavior of a tantrum and a meltdown (including an Autistic meltdown) may be similar, meltdowns are generally the result of sensory overload rather than goal-oriented behaviour, and are outside of the control of the individual experiencing them. Applying common strategies for dealing with tantrums in children when a child is experiencing a meltdown is ineffective and can worsen the distress of the child.

== Aberrations ==
Freud considered that the Wolf Man's development of temper tantrums was connected with his seduction by his sister: he became "discontented, irritable and violent, took offence on every possible occasion, and then flew into a rage and screamed like a savage". Freud linked the tantrums to an unconscious need for punishment driven by feelings of guilt—something which he thought could be generalised to many other cases of childhood tantrums.

Heinz Kohut contended that tantrums were rages of anger, caused by the thwarting of the infant's grandiose-exhibitionist core. The blow to the inflated self-image, when a child's wishes are (however justifiably) refused, creates fury because it strikes at the feeling of omnipotence.

Jealousy over the birth of a sibling, and resulting aggression, may also provoke negativistic tantrums, as the effort at controlling the feelings overloads the child's system of self-regulation.

== In later life ==
Writer William Makepeace Thackeray claimed that in later life "you may tell a tantrum as far as you can see one, by the distressed and dissatisfied expression of its countenance —'Tantrumical', if we may term it so".

The willingness of the celebrity to throw tantrums whenever thwarted to the least degree is a kind of acquired situational narcissism or tantrumical behavior.

If older people show tantrums, they might often be signs of immaturity or a mental or developmental disability; and often autistic or ADHD meltdowns are incorrectly labelled tantrums. It can also occur in neurotypical people under extreme stress.

== See also ==
- Acting out – Performing an action considered bad
- Amok syndrome – Aggressive behavioral pattern
- Berserker fights in a frenzy
- Philippic – Damning speech to condemn a particular political actor
- Attention seeking – To act in a way that is likely to elicit attention
- Histrionic personality disorder – Personality disorder involving excessive emotionality and attention-seeking
