= Horatio Pollock =

American statistician

Horatio Milo Pollock (2 September 1868 – 8 May 1950) was an American statistician.

He was born in the village of Patria, New York, in Schoharie County on 2 September 1868, and attended a rural school. Pollock started teaching during the winter at the age of 17. He continued working on the family farm until the age of 20. That year, he completed a high school curriculum in 31 weeks, and subsequently enrolled at Union College from which he graduated in 1895. While in college, Pollock competed in wrestling and sprinting. He went to the University of Leipzig for doctoral degree in biology, graduating in 1897. That same year, Pollock also finished a master's degree from Union College. Upon his return to the United States, Pollock taught biology, physics, and German at Albany High School until 1900. For the next seven years, Pollock was an examiner for the New York State Civil Service Commission. Starting in 1907, Pollock taught economics and biology at the New York State College for Teachers. He soon joined the Union College faculty to teach economics and sociology. By 1911, Pollock returned to the New York state government, specifically the Department of Mental Hygiene. Pollock streamlined record keeping and the use of psychometrics throughout the department. Pollock's work drew the attention of Surgeon General Rupert Blue, who asked him to do the same for the United States Army's newly established division of neurology and psychiatry in the midst of World War I. Pollock later devised a similar system for the state of Illinois. From 1915 to 1935, Pollock was editor of the Psychiatric Quarterly, after which he edited the Mental Hygiene News for the New York State Department of Mental Hygiene until retirement in 1943.

Pollock was statistical consultant to the National Committee for Mental Hygiene for 25 years, and helped compile a statistical manual for hospitals jointly sponsored by the committee and the American Psychiatric Association. Pollock completed the same task for the American Association on Mental Deficiency. The American Association on Mental Deficiency granted Pollock membership status, and he was elected its president in 1943. Other societies to award Pollock membership included the American Academy of Political and Social Science, and the American Association for the Advancement of Science. He was named an honorary member of the American Psychiatric Association. Additionally, Pollock was a manager of the American Occupational Therapy Association, chairman of the International Committee on Mental Hygiene and the committee on statistics for the International Congress on Mental Hygiene. He also served on the medical council of the United States Veterans Bureau, and was elected a fellow of the American Statistical Association. Pollock died in Petersburg, Virginia on 8 May 1950.
