= James Kocsis =

James Kocsis is professor of psychiatry at Weill Cornell Medical College and Payne Whitney Psychiatric Clinic. His clinical research trials focused on the treatment of chronic depression, initially with antidepressant medications and, more recently, with psychotherapy. These studies were pivotal in the reconceptualization of depressive neurosis, a personality disorder, into dysthymia, a variant of major depression.

Kocsis graduated from Amherst and Cornell Medical College.
