= Robert Glick =

American psychiatrist

Dr. Robert Glick is a writer and professor of psychiatry at Columbia University College of Physicians and Surgeons, and a Supervising and Training Psychoanalyst at the Columbia University Center for Psychoanalytic Training and Research; he was formerly a director of the Center.

He graduated summa cum laude from Yale University in 1962, where he was a member of Manuscript Society. He received his medical degree from Columbia University College of Physicians and Surgeons, did his internship at the University of Virginia Hospital, Mixed Medical, 1966–1967 and his residency at NYS Psychiatric Institute/New York Presbyterian Hospital, Psychiatry, 1967 - 1970. This was followed by a fellowship at the Center For Psychoanalytic Training & Research/Columbia University, Psychoanalytic Medicine, 1969 - 1978. He is Board Certified, American Board of Psychiatry and Neurology.

== Publications ==
Glick is the author or editor of three books on psychiatry, and numerous articles on psychoanalytic training and emergency psychiatry.

=== Books ===
- Glick, Robert A., and Donald I. Meyers., eds. Masochism: Current Psychoanalytic Perspectives. Hillsdale, NJ: Analytic Press, 1988. ISBN 978-0-88163-046-6
- Roose, Steven P., and Robert A. Glick. Anxiety As Symptom and Signal. Hillsdale, N.J.: Analytic Press, 1995. ISBN 978-0-88163-118-0
- Glick, Robert A., and Steven P. Roose. eds. Rage, Power, and Aggression. New Haven: Yale University Press, 1993. ISBN 978-0-300-05271-8
- Glick, Robert A., and Stanley Bone., eds. Pleasure Beyond the Pleasure Principle. New Haven: Yale University Press, 1990. ISBN 978-0-300-04793-6

=== Peer-reviewed journal articles ===
- Andreescu C, Glick RM, Emeremni CA, Houck PR, Mulsant BH (August 2011). "Acupuncture for the treatment of major depressive disorder: a randomized controlled trial". J Clin Psychiatry. 72 (8): 1129–35. doi:10.4088/JCP.10m06105. PMC 10536993. PMID 21672495.
- Boudreaux ED, Allen MH, Claassen C; et al. (2009). "The Psychiatric Emergency Research Collaboration-01: methods and results". Gen Hosp Psychiatry. 31 (6): 515–22. doi:10.1016/j.genhosppsych.2009.04.009. PMC 2852101. PMID 19892209.
- Glick RA, Roose SP (June 2009). "Empirical research, psychoanalytic training, and psychoanalytic attitudes". J Am Psychoanal Assoc. 57 (3): 657–61. doi:10.1177/0003065109340504. PMID 19528541.
- Glick RA, Stern GJ (December 2008). "Writing about clinical theory and psychoanalytic process". J Am Psychoanal Assoc. 56 (4): 1261–77. doi:10.1177/0003065108326108. PMID 19037126.
- Glick RA (December 2008). "Writing as psychoanalytic pedagogy: a primer (the Columbia Psychoanalytic Writing Program)". J Am Psychoanal Assoc. 56 (4): 1227–30. doi:10.1177/0003065108325970. PMID 19037123.
- Glick RA (2007). "Psychoanalytic education needs to change: what's feasible? Introduction to Wallerstein". J Am Psychoanal Assoc. 55 (3): 949–52. doi:10.1177/00030651070550030801. PMID 17915654.
- Blum WF, Ranke MB (1990). "Use of insulin-like growth factor-binding protein 3 for the evaluation of growth disorders". Horm. Res. 33 Suppl 4 (4): 31–7. doi:10.1159/000181581. PMID 1700965.
- Glick RA (2004). "Psychoanalytic education and the new analyst". J Am Psychoanal Assoc. 52 (3): 829–32. doi:10.1177/00030651040520031001. PMID 15487148.
- Mullen LS, Rieder RO, Glick RA, Luber B, Rosen PJ (September 2004). "Testing psychodynamic psychotherapy skills among psychiatric residents: the psychodynamic psychotherapy competency test". Am J Psychiatry. 161 (9): 1658–64. doi:10.1176/appi.ajp.161.9.1658. PMID 15337657.
- Cutler JL, Goldyne A, Markowitz JC, Devlin MJ, Glick RA (September 2004). "Comparing cognitive behavior therapy, interpersonal psychotherapy, and psychodynamic psychotherapy". Am J Psychiatry. 161 (9): 1567–73. doi:10.1176/appi.ajp.161.9.1567. PMID 15337644.
- Brasch J, Glick RL, Cobb TG, Richmond J (2004). "Residency training in emergency psychiatry: a model curriculum developed by the education committee of the american association for emergency psychiatry". Acad Psychiatry. 28 (2): 95–103. doi:10.1176/appi.ap.28.2.95. PMID 15298860.
- Glick RA (April 2003). "Idealization and psychoanalytic learning". Psychoanal Q. 72 (2): 377–401. doi:10.1002/j.2167-4086.2003.tb00135.x. PMID 12718250.
- Cabaniss DL, Glick RA, Roose SP (2001). "The Columbia Supervision Project: data from the dyad". J Am Psychoanal Assoc. 49 (1): 235–67. doi:10.1177/00030651010490010501. PMID 11379723.
- Milner KK, Florence T, Glick RL (December 1999). "Mood and anxiety syndromes in emergency psychiatry". Psychiatr. Clin. North Am. 22 (4): 755–77. doi:10.1016/s0193-953x(05)70124-6. PMID 10623969.
- Olds DD, Glick RA (April 1999). "Kandel's challenge to psychoanalysts". Am J Psychiatry. 156 (4): 662–3, author reply 665–6. doi:10.1176/ajp.156.4.662a. PMID 10200758.
- Glick R, Eagle P, Luber B, Roose S (August 1996). "The fate of training cases". Int J Psychoanal. 77 (Pt 4): 803–12. PMID 8876337.
- Glick R, Harrison W, Endicott J, McGrath P, Quitkin FM (1991). "Treatment of premenstrual dysphoric symptoms in depressed women". J Am Med Women's Assoc. 46 (6): 182–5. PMID 1744374.
- Fogel GI, Glick RA (July 1991). "The analyst's postgraduate development--rereading Freud and working theory through". Psychoanal Q. 60 (3): 396–425. doi:10.1080/21674086.1991.11927316. PMID 1924604.
- Glick RA (October 1987). "Forced terminations". J Am Acad Psychoanal. 15 (4): 449–63. doi:10.1521/jaap.1.1987.15.4.449. PMID 3667386.
- Glick RA, Meyerson AT (1980). "The use of psychoanalytic concepts in crisis intervention". Int J Psychoanal Psychother. 8: 171–88. PMID 7191836.
