= Fredric N. Busch =

American psychiatrist (born 1958)

Fredric Neal Busch (born 1958) is a Weill Cornell Medical College clinical professor of psychiatry based in New York City. He is also a faculty member at the Columbia University Center for Psychoanalytic Training and Research.

Dr. Busch has worked to modify psychodynamic psychotherapeutic approaches to target specific problems and symptoms, referred to as problem focused psychodynamic psychotherapy. Dr. Busch has co-written several manuals and articles on focused psychodynamic approaches to psychiatric disorders, including anxiety, panic and depression. He has been involved in research on panic focused psychodynamic psychotherapy, including the first study to demonstrate efficacy of psychodynamic treatment of panic disorder, published in the American Journal of Psychiatry. Additionally, Dr. Busch has written on integrating the theoretical conceptualizations and clinical approaches of psychoanalytic treatments and medication, and coauthoring two seminal papers on treatment triangles, addressing the complex interactions of the psychotherapist, psychopharmacologist, and patient. He has also written about psychodynamic approaches to behavior change and to trauma. He is involved in a research project using this treatment for Veterans with Post-traumatic stress disorder at the Veterans Administration New York Harbor Healthcare System.

Busch attended Duke University for his undergraduate degree, University of Texas Southwestern Medical Center, Weill Cornell Payne Whitney psychiatric residency program in New York City, and the Columbia Center for Psychoanalytic Training and Research.

== Bibliography ==
- Busch FN, Milrod BL, Singer M, Aronson A (2012). Panic-Focused Psychodynamic Psychotherapy, Extended Range. New York, NY: Routledge. ISBN 978-0415871600..
- Busch FN, Sandberg L (2007). Psychotherapy and Medication - The Challenge of Integration. Analytic Press. ISBN 978-0-88163-451-8.
- Busch FN, Rudden MG, Shapiro T (2016). Psychodynamic Treatment of Depression. American Psychiatric Publishing. ISBN 978-1615370351.
- Busch, Fredric (2008). Mentalization - Theoretical Considerations, Research Findings, and Clinical Implications. Analytic Press. ISBN 978-0-88163-485-3.
- Busch, Fredric N (2018). Psychodynamic Approaches to Behavioral Change. American Psychiatric Publishing. ISBN 978-1-61537-130-3.
- Busch, FN, Milrod, BL, Chen C, Singer M (2021). Trauma Focused Psychodynamic Psychotherapy. Oxford University Press. ISBN 978-0197574355.
- Busch, Fredric N (2021). Problem Focused Psychodynamic Psychotherapy. American Psychiatric Press. ISBN 978-1615373246.
