= Jen Banbury =

American journalist

Jen Banbury is an American playwright, author and journalist. She studied at Yale University and was a member of Manuscript Society. After publishing plays and a novel, she turned to reporting in 2003, becoming a freelancer who has reported for NPR, Salon.com, and other organizations. In 2003 and 2004, she reported from Baghdad for Salon. On March 3, 2004, Salon published her story "Guantanamo on Steroids", one of the earliest articles about U.S. soldiers' abuse of Iraqi prisoners at Abu Ghraib. It was listed as one of the "Best of Salon" for 2003. Her Salon reporting was cited and her story "Night Raid in Baghdad" was reprinted in Boots on the Ground: Stories of American Soldiers from Iraq to Afghanistan by Clint Willis.

== Publications ==
- Novel: Like a Hole in the Head, 1998 (ISBN 0316171107). Mentioned on pages 14, 18, 138, and 139 of Novelist's Essential Guide to Crafting Scenes by Raymond Obstfeld (ISBN 0898799732).
- Play: How Alex Looks When She's Hurt, 1998
