= Mary Jane Sherfey =

American physician

Mary Jane Sherfey (1918–1983) was an American psychiatrist and writer on female sexuality. She received her medical degree from Indiana University School of Medicine in 1943, where she attended lectures on marriage and sexuality given by Alfred Kinsey. Sherfey had a private practice in New York City and was on the staff of the Payne Whitney Clinic of the New York Hospital – Cornell Medical Center.

== Early life and education ==
Sherfey was from Brazil, Indiana. She received her bachelor degree in chemistry from Indiana University Bloomington in 1940.

== Career ==
In 1961, Sherfey's interest in female biology was intensified when she came upon the inductor theory, which demonstrated that the human embryo is female until hormonally “induced” to become male. Determined to popularize a fact that had lain in neglect since its discovery in the 1950s, Sherfey began researching the subject and familiarizing herself with a variety of disciplines, including embryology, anatomy, primatology and anthropology. Many of her findings appear in The Nature and Evolution of Female Sexuality, which initially took form as an article contesting the existence of vaginal orgasm, published in the Journal of the American Psychoanalytic Association in 1966.

In her earlier works, Sherfey noted that "the strength of the sex drive determines the force required to suppress it." In The Nature and Evolution of Female Sexuality, she introduced the concept that "female sexuality was an insatiable drive that had been repressed for the sake of maintaining a civilized agrarian society" and helped to explain why knowledge of the clitoris had been ignored or forbidden for over three hundred years.

== Death ==
In 1983 at 65 years of age she died from a heart attack at her home in Rusk, Texas.

== Works ==
- The Nature and Evolution of Female Sexuality, Random House, ISBN 0-394-46539-3
- Anxiety and Magic Thinking: The Psychogenetic Analysis of Phobia and the Neurosis of Abandonment

with Charles Odier and Marie-Louise Schoelly, Intl Universities Pr Inc, ISBN 0-8236-0400-4
