= The Interpersonal World of the Infant =

1985 book by Daniel Stern

- First edition
- Author: Daniel Stern
- Subject: Developmental psychology
- Publisher: Basic Books
- Publication date: 1985
- ISBN: 978-0-465-09589-6
- OCLC: 45430229

The Interpersonal World of the Infant (1985) is one of the most prominent works of psychoanalyst Daniel N. Stern, in which he describes the development of four interrelated senses of self. These senses of self develop over the lifespan, but make significant developmental strides during sensitive periods in the first two years of life. The mother or other primary attachment figure plays a critical role in helping the infant with this developmental process.

== Senses of self ==
=== Emergent self ===
At birth, the infant experiences the world as a barrage of seemingly unrelated sensory stimuli, which s/he gradually learns to "yoke" together using cues such as "hedonic tone" (emotional quality), and temporal and intensity patterns shared between stimuli. This process of integrating and organizing experience, called the emergent sense of self, continues until about two months. It serves as "the basis for the child's ability to learn and create," and is what Stern believes is the sense of self that is disrupted in the negative symptoms of schizophrenia and other psychotic disorders.

=== Core self ===
Around two months, the child's organization of sensory experience reaches a point where s/he is able to sufficiently organize experience to have integrated episodic memories. This enables a higher level of sophistication organizing future experiences, as the child is able to discern discrete invariant objects from cross-modal sensory stimuli and to use these to arrive at generalizations about what s/he can expect in the future from his/her environment. In this process, the infant also becomes aware of its own features ("self-invariants"), which give the child its sense of core self as an entity distinct from other objects in its environment.

The child also develops generalized representations of its interactions with its primary caregiver during this time, a concept related to and informed by attachment theory. The child learns whether it can depend on its caregiver to provide for its needs and the types of affective and behavioral responses it can expect in specific situations, which serve as the basis for its future attachment style. An important role of the caregiver during this time is to assist the child in regulating its affect. Eventually, if all goes well, the child will internalize these experiences with the primary attachment figure and be able to invoke these memories to help herself self-regulate her affect. Stern believes that ruptures during this phase of development result in borderline pathology.

=== Subjective self ===
Around seven months, the child begins to be aware that her thoughts and experiences are distinct from those of other people, that there is a gap between her subjective reality and that of other people. However, with proper attunement by the primary attachment figure, the child also becomes aware that this gap can be bridged through intersubjective experiences, such as sharing affect and focus of attention. A lack of such attunement, as could happen, for example, if the mother has depression, can deprive the child of sufficient intersubjective experiences, leaving the child unable to connect to other people in any meaningful way, which Stern believes may underlie narcissistic personality disorder and antisocial personality disorder.

=== Verbal self ===
Around 15 months, the child develops the capacity for symbolic representation and language, and becomes capable of creating complex abstract mental representations of experiences, facilitating intersubjectivity but shifting the child's focus towards those things that can be represented and communicated in language.

== Clinical implications ==
Disturbances (e.g. abuse, trauma) that occur during sensitive periods and thereby interfere with important developmental processes may have more severe consequences than "insults" later in life. According to Stern, these disturbances may become overt any point in time and the nature rather than the time of the insult will determine the resulting conflict. Additionally, later psychopathology will manifest itself in a domain related to the sensitive period in which the insult took place.

Regarding therapy, Stern highlights the importance of "now moments" as a potential for change and growth in the client as well as the therapist, but also in the therapeutic relationship. These can be described as moments of intersubjective emotional relatedness and are, in Stern's opinion, necessary for positive therapeutic outcome.

== Criticism ==
A critic suggested that the nature of insults during the sensitive periods fails to predict the specific clinical issues that subsequently develop, undermining the clinical utility of this theory.

== See also ==
- Stern's tripartite self
