= Theodore Shapiro (psychiatrist) =

American psychiatrist

- Born: United States
- Education: Wesleyan University; Weill Cornell Medical College
- Occupations: Psychiatrist, psychoanalysis, professor

Theodore Shapiro was a psychiatrist and psychoanalyst in New York. He died on August 11, 2026 at age 96.

== Academic and medical career ==
Shapiro served as director of the division of child psychiatry at Weill Cornell Medical and New York Presbyterian/Weill Cornell Medicine for over 25 years, until he took emeritus status in 2002. Between 1984 and 1993, Shapiro served as Editor of the Journal of the American Psychoanalytic Association.

Shapiro published over 200 research articles and chapters, and he authored or co-authored nine psychiatric textbooks. As Arnold Cooper wrote, "his publications include significant contributions to our understanding of empathy, autism, linguistic structure, symbol formation, and diagnosis, among other topics."

At the time of his death, Shapiro was a professor emeritus in psychiatry and pediatrics at Weill Cornell Medical College and the Payne Whitney Psychiatric Clinic. He was also a long-time training and supervising psychoanalyst at the New York Psychoanalytic Institute and a faculty member of the Columbia University Center for Psychoanalytic Training and Research.

Shapiro graduated from Wesleyan University in 1953 and from the Weill Cornell Medical College in 1957.

== Published works ==
- Infant Psychiatry: A New Synthesis (with Eveoleen N. Rexford and Louis W. Sander). Yale University Press, 1976. ISBN 978-0-300-01890-5.
- Psychoanalysis and Contemporary Science (edited collection). International Universities Press, 1977. ISBN 978-0-8236-5145-0.
- Clinical psycholinguistics. Plenum Press, 1979. ISBN 978-0-306-40249-4.
- The Concept of Structure in Psychoanalysis. International Universities Press, 1989. ISBN 978-0-8236-1041-9.
- Affect: Psychoanalytic Perspectives (with Robert N. Emde). International Universities Press, 1992. ISBN 978-0-8236-0116-5.
- Research in psychoanalysis: process, development, outcome (with Robert N. Emde). International Universities Press, 1995. ISBN 978-0-8236-5795-7.
- Manual of panic-focused psychodynamic psychotherapy (with Barbara Milrod, Arnold Cooper, and Fredric Busch). American Psychiatric Pub., 1996. ISBN 978-0-88048-871-6.
- Psychodynamic treatment of depression (with Fredric Busch and Marie Rudden). American Psychiatric Pub., 2004. ISBN 978-1-58562-084-5.
- Psychodynamic Approaches to the Adolescent with Panic Disorder (with Barbara Milrod and Fredric Busch). Krieger Publishing Company, 2004. ISBN 978-1-57524-230-9.
