= Richard Isay =

American psychoanalyst and writer (1934–2012)

Richard A Isay
- Born: Richard Alexander Isay; December 13, 1934; Pittsburgh, Pennsylvania
- Died: June 28, 2012 (aged 77); New York, New York
- Resting place: Green-Wood Cemetery, Brooklyn, New York
- Occupations: Psychiatrist, Psychoanalyst, Author, Gay Activist
- Spouse: Gordon Harrell
- Children: David Isay, Joshua Isay
- Writing career
- Language: English
- Genre: Gay Male Psychology
- Notable works: Being Homosexual: Gay Men and their Development, Becoming Gay: The Journey to Self-Acceptance, Commitment and Healing: Gay Men and the Need for Romantic Love

Richard A. Isay (December 13, 1934 – June 28, 2012) was an American psychiatrist, psychoanalyst, author and gay activist. He was a professor of psychiatry at Weill Cornell Medical College and a faculty member of the Columbia University Center for Psychoanalytic Training and Research. Isay is considered a pioneer who changed the way that psychoanalysts view homosexuality.

== Biography ==
Richard Isay was born and raised in Pittsburgh, Pennsylvania. Isay graduated from Haverford College and the University of Rochester School of Medicine and Dentistry. Soon after completing his psychiatry residency at Yale University, he completed his training at the Western New England Psychoanalytic Institute. Throughout his career, Isay maintained a private practice of psychiatry and psychoanalysis and was an influential teacher and supervisor. He was the program chairman of the American Psychoanalytic Association (APsaA), the American Program Chairman of the International Psychoanalytical Association and chairman of the Committee on Gay, Lesbian and Bisexual Issues of the American Psychiatric Association.

In 1983, as chair of the APsaA's program committee, Isay organized a panel called "New Perspectives on Homosexuality". Isay argued that homosexuality is a normal variant of sexual identity, and that psychoanalysts should stop trying to change the sexual orientation of their patients, which he considered injurious, creating a firestorm of controversy. "Several analysts walked out", Isay later recalled. Isay soon became the first openly gay member of the association.

Isay wrote widely on the subjects of psychoanalysis and homosexuality, including texts such as Being Homosexual: Gay Men and Their Development. Being Homosexual was one of the first books to argue that homosexuality is an inborn identity, and the first to describe a non-pathological developmental pathway that is specific to gay men. It is widely considered a breakthrough in psychoanalytic theory and an important, historical work.

In an autobiographical chapter of his book, Becoming Gay: The Journey to Self-Acceptance, Isay tells the story of how he spent ten years trying to change his homosexual orientation. During his analysis, he married. After completing his analysis, he realized that he was, in fact, gay. He was closeted in his professional life for several years, during which time he became a prominent member of the American Psychoanalytic Association. He began to write about homosexuality shortly after meeting his life partner and future husband, Gordon Harrell, in 1979.

In Becoming Gay, Isay recounts that with the help of the American Civil Liberties Union, he threatened to sue the APsaA, due to their discriminatory policies. As a result, on May 9, 1991, the APsaA adopted a non-discrimination policy for the training of analytic candidates and changed its position statement on homosexuality. 1991 was also the year that the APsaA agreed to allow gays and lesbians to become training analysts, and to promote gay and lesbian teachers and supervisors.

This fundamental change in position by the APsaA created a ripple effect that was felt throughout the profession. The ApsaA was and is the preeminent psychoanalytic organization in the world. These changes of position and practice by the APsaA became a stimulus for reform. They were slowly copied by psychoanalytic, psychiatric, psychological and social work organizations internationally. A few years later, these changes were adopted by psychoanalytic groups in the UK.

Isay was an early proponent of gay marriage. In 1989, Isay told U.S. News & World Report: "If the time comes in which there's a change to society's attitude toward homosexuality - when, for example, gay marriages and adoptions are possible and gay couples reap the same social benefits as heterosexual couples - I believe there will be a corresponding change in the behavior of gay men, with much less emphasis on the sexual act and more emphasis on relationships". This was long before gay marriage had become an issue within the mainstream, LGBT community.

In 1997, the APsaA became the first national mental-health organization to support gay marriage, a policy that was spearheaded by Isay.

In his 2006 book, Commitment and Healing: Gay Men and the Need for Romantic Love, Isay describes the difficulty many gay men have sustaining romantic, loving relationships.

Isay appeared on Larry King Live, The Oprah Winfrey Show, 20/20, The Morning Show and others.

In 1993, Isay was featured in the documentary "America Undercover: Why am I Gay? Stories of Coming Out in America".

In 1995, Isay was profiled in the book, Gay Soul: Finding the Heart of Gay Spirit and Nature, by Mark Thompson.

On August 13, 2011, Isay married Gordon Harrell (born 1958), his partner of 32 years.

On November 12, 2011, Isay received the highly prestigious Hans W. Loewald award, from the International Forum on Psychoanalytic Education.

Isay died on June 28, 2012, of complications of adenocarcinoma. He was interred at Green-Wood Cemetery in Brooklyn, New York.

On June 14, 2014, Isay was featured in the first gay themed tour of Green-Wood Cemetery. Since 2014, the "Gay Grave Tour", as it is now called, has become part of Green-Wood Cemetery's annual summer program.

== Education ==
- Haverford College A.B.1952-1956
- MD University of Rochester School of Medicine and Dentistry 1957–1961
- Intern (rotating) University Hospitals of Cleveland (Case-Western Reserve) 1961–1962
- Psychiatry, Yale University, Department of Psychiatry 1962–1965
- Psychoanalysis, Western New England Institute for Psychoanalysis 1968–1973

== Honorary ==
- Phi Beta Kappa, 1956
- Fellow, American Psychiatric Association, 1979

== Certification ==
- National Board of Medical Examiners, July 1962
- American Board of Psychiatry and Neurology, October 1968
- American Psychoanalytic Association, December 1974

== Professional career ==
- U.S. Navy Submarine Base, Groton, Connecticut 1965–1967
- U.S. Navy Medical Corps, Lieutenant Commander, Staff Psychiatrist 1967–1975
- Assistant Clinical Professor of Psychiatry, Yale University 1967–1975
- Associate Clinical Professor of Psychiatry, Yale University, Department of Psychiatry and Yale Child Study Center 1975–1981
- Clinical Associate Professor of Psychiatry, Cornell Medical College 1981–1989
- Faculty, Columbia University Center for Psychoanalytic Training and Research 1981–2012
- Private Practice of Psychoanalysis and Psychotherapy 1981–2012
- Clinical Professor of Psychiatry, Cornell Medical College 1989–2012, Lecturer in psychology: Columbia University,

== Books ==
- "Being Homosexual: Gay Men and Their Development" Ferrar, Strauss, and Giroux 1989
- "Becoming Gay: The Journey to Self-Acceptance" Pantheon, 1996
- "Commitment and Healing: Gay Men and the Need for Romantic Love" Wiley 2006

== Book chapters ==
- Homosexuality in Homosexual and Heterosexual Men: Some Distinction and Implications for Treatment". "The Psychology of Men" G. Fogel, F. Lane, R. Liebert (eds) Oxford University Press 1988
- Psychoanalytic Theory and Therapy of Gay Men, "Homosexuality/Heterosexuality", D. McWhirter, J Reinisch, S. Saunders (eds). Oxford University Press 1988

== Publications ==
- "Staff Conference: Problems of the Dying Patient" (with McKegney. F.P. and Balsam, Alan). New York State Journal of Medicine, Vol. 65, No. 18, 1965
- "The Submariners Wives Syndrome". The Psychiatric Quarterly, Vol. 42, No. 4, 1968
- "The Draft-Age Adolescent in Treatment", The Psychiatric Quarterly, Vol. 43, No. 2, 1969
- "The Influence of the Primal Scene on the Sexual Behavior of the Early Adolescent", Journal of the American Psychoanalytic Association, Vol. 23, No. 3, 1975
- "Ambiguity in Speech", Journal of the American Psychoanalytic Association, Vol. 25, No. 2, 1977
- "Panel Report on "The Pathogeneity of the Primal Scene", Journal of the American Psychoanalytic Association, Vol. 26, No. 1, 1976
- "Panel Report on Adult Masturbation: Clinical Perspectives, Journal of the American Psychoanalytic Association, Vol. 28, No. 3, 1980
- Review of "Hysteria, The Elusive Neurosis", by Alan Krohn, The Psychoanalytic Quarterly, Vol 49, No. 3, 1980
- "Late Adolescence: The Second Separation Stage of Adolescence", The Course of Life, Vol 11, Greenspan S.I., and Pollock, G.N. (eds) U.S. Department of Health and Human Services. 1981
- "Commentary: La Formation du Psychoanalyste, Lebovici, Solnit, A.J. (eds), Presses Universitaires de France. 1982
- "On the Analytic Therapy of Homosexual Men", The Psychoanalytic Study of the Child, Vol. 40, 1985. Reprinted with additions as "On the Analytic Therapy of Gay Men", in Psychotherapy with Lesbians and Gay Men. Stein, T.S, and Cohen, C.J. (eds) Plenum Medical Book Company, 1986
- "Homosexuality in Homosexual and Heterosexual Men: Some Distinctions and Implications for Treatment". The Psychology of Men, C. Fogel, F. Lane, R Liebert (eds) Basic Books 1987
- "The Development of Sexual Identity in Homosexual Men". The Psychoanalytic Study of the Child, Vol. 41, 1986
- "Fathers and their Homosexually Inclined Sons in Childhood", The Psychoanalytic Study of the Child, Vol. 42, 1987
- "Psychoanalytic Theory and the Therapy of Gay Men", Homosexuality/Heterosexuality. D. McWhirter, J Reinisch, S. Saunders. Oxford University Press
- "Developmental Issues in Dynamic Therapy with Gay Men". Directions in Psychiatry, Vol 11, Haterleigh Co, 1991
- "The Homosexual Analyst: Clinical Considerations". The Psychoanalytic Study of the Child, Vol 46, 1991
- "Dynamic Psychotherapy with Gay Men: Developmental Considerations". Review of Psychiatry, American Psychiatric Press, Vol 12, 1993
- "Heterosexually Married Homosexual Men: Clinical and Developmental Issues". American Journal of Orthopsychiatry 1998

== Public lectures ==
- University of Pennsylvania, Dept of Psychiatry, Grand Rounds, March 1995
- Plenary Presentation, Hawaii District Branch, American Psychiatric Association, April 1995
- Los Angeles Child Development Center, February 1997
- New Ways Ministry of the Catholic Church, Pittsburgh, PA, March 1997
- National Psychological Association for Psychoanalysis, November 1997
- Visiting Lecturer, Royal Society of Medicine, London, England, October 1997
- Visiting Lecturer, British Association of Psychotherapists, London, England, October 1997
- New Jersey Psychological Association, November 1997
- "On Same-Sex Marriage", Weill Medical College and Cornell University, April 1999
- Visiting Professor and Lecturer, Dept of Psychiatry, The Norwegian University of Science and Technology, Trondheim, Norway, May 2000
- Karen Horney Psychoanalytic Institute and Center, General Lecture, January 2001
- Visiting Professor and Daniel Prager Lecture, George Washington University Medical College April 2001
- Meet the Author, American Psychoanalytic Association, May 2002
- "Gay Men and the Problem of Romantic Love", Weill-Cornell Medical College, Department of Psychiatry December 2003
- "Gay Men and the Problem of Romantic Love", American Psychiatric Association, May 2004

== Editorial boards ==
- Psychoanalytic Inquiry 1981–1991
- The International Journal of Psychoanalytic Psychotherapy 1983
- Associate editor, Models of the Mind: Their Relationship to Clinical Work. I.U.P. 1985
- Journal of Gay and Lesbian Psychotherapy 1987–1992
- Journal of Depression and Stress 1995

== Organizations ==
- American Psychiatric Association 1965–2012
- Western New England Psychoanalytic Society 1974–2012
- International Psycho-Analytical Association 1974–2012
- American Psychoanalytic Association 1974–2012
- Western New England Institute for Psychoanalysis 1975–1988
- Association for Psychoanalytic Medicine 1981–2012
- Board of directors, National Lesbian and Gay Health Foundation 1990, Vice-president 1992–1996
- Vice president, National Lesbian and Gay Health Foundation 1992
- Board of directors, Hetrick Martin Institute for Gay and Lesbian Youth 1992–1995
- Senior consultant, Columbia University Center for Gay, Lesbian and Bisexual Mental Health 1994–1996

== Committees ==
- Admissions Committee, Yale Medical School 1973–1981
- Chairman, Extension Division, Western New England Psychoanalytic Society 1974–1980
- Co-editor, Newsletter, American Psychoanalytic Society 1976–1980
- Secretary, Program Committee (31st Congress) International Psychoanalytical Association 1977–1979
- President, Western New England Psychoanalytic Society 1979–1981
- Chairman, American Program (32nd Congress) International Psychoanalytical Association 1979–1981
- Chairman, Ad Hoc Committee on the Desirability of Non-Medical Training, American Psychoanalytic Association 1982
- Co-chairman, Program Committee, American Psychoanalytic Association 1980–1981
- Chairman, Program Committee, American Psychoanalytic Association 1981–1984
- Committee on Gay, Lesbian and Bisexual Issues, American Psychiatric Association, 1986–1993, Chairman 1991–1993

== Awards ==
- Gay and Lesbian Analysts "for outstanding contribution to psychoanalysis". (New York City 1996)
- 1996 Best Psychology Book: Becoming Gay, Books For A Better Life, Pantheon Books (1996)
- Winfield Scott Award, "in recognition of outstanding contributions and his selfless approach to health care, education and activism on behalf of the Lesbian and Gay community". (July 28, 1998)
- AGLP 2000 Distinguished Service Award, "for his pioneering work in combating homophobia in the psychoanalytic community as well as his many publications on the process of coming out and the psychological development of gay men and lesbians". (May 17, 2000)
- Callen-Lourde Community Health Provider Award. Community Health Awards (November 15, 2005)
- Hans W. Loewald Memorial Award "for original and outstanding contributions to the ongoing development of psychoanalytic theory, practice and application". International Forum on Psychoanalytic Education, 22nd Annual Interdisciplinary Conference (November 12, 2011)
