= Narcissism =

Self-centered personality style

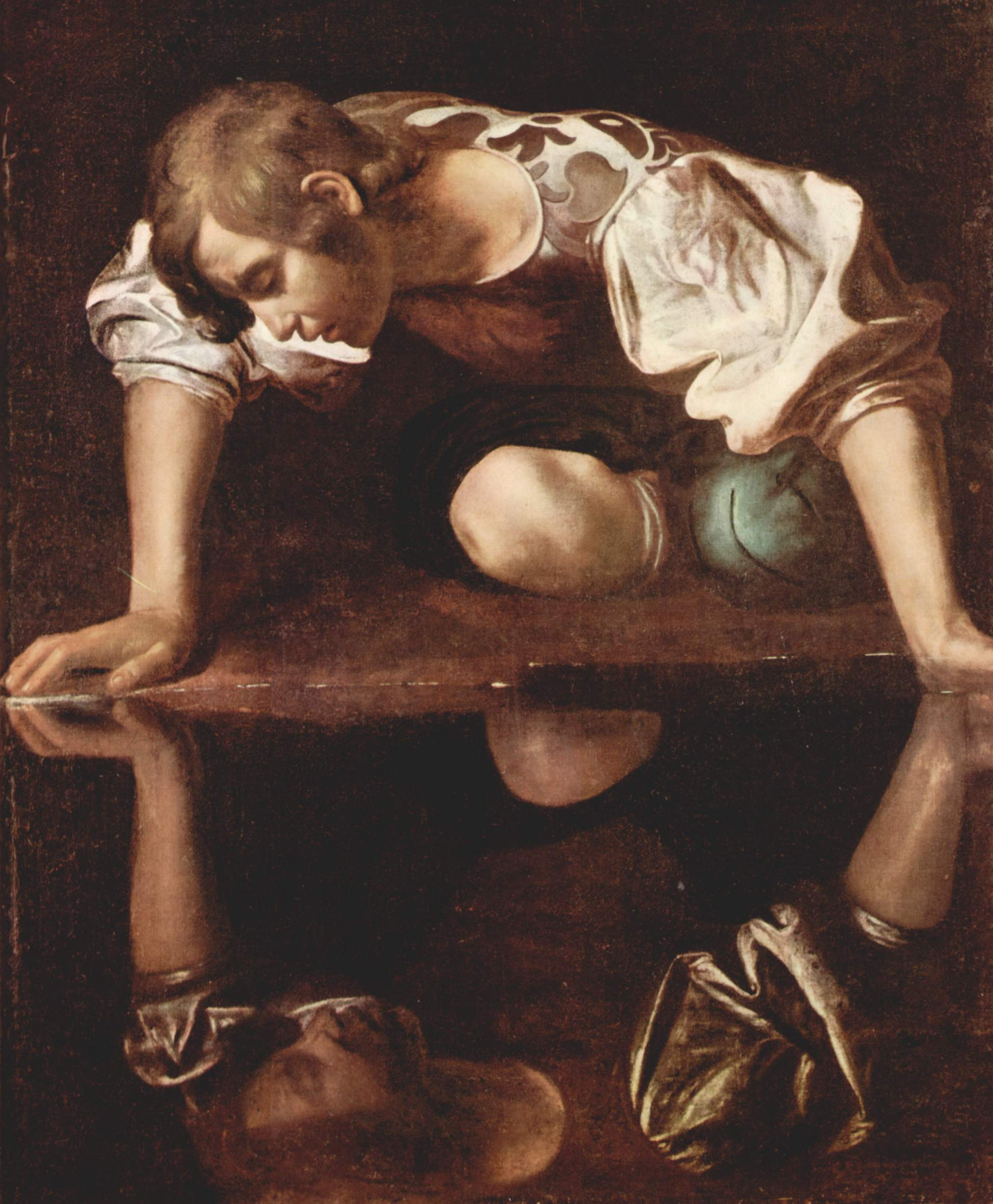
Narcissus (1597–99) by Caravaggio; the man in love with his own reflection

Narcissism is a self-centered personality style characterized as having an excessive preoccupation with oneself and one's own needs, often at the expense of others. Named after the Greek mythological figure Narcissus who fell in love with his own reflection, narcissism has evolved into a psychological concept studied extensively since the early 20th century, and it has been deemed highly relevant in various societal domains.

Narcissism exists on a continuum that ranges from normal to abnormal personality expression. While many psychologists believe that a moderate degree of narcissism is normal and healthy in humans, there are also more extreme forms, observable particularly in people who have narcissistic personality disorder (NPD), where one's narcissistic qualities become pathological, leading to functional impairment and psychosocial disability. It has also been discussed in dark triad studies, along with subclinical psychopathy and Machiavellianism.

== Historical background ==
The term narcissism is derived from Narcissus, a character in Greek mythology best known from the telling in Roman poet Ovid's Metamorphoses, written in 8 CE. Book III of the poem tells the mythical story of a handsome young man, Narcissus, who spurns the advances of many potential lovers. When Narcissus rejects the nymph Echo, who was cursed to only echo the sounds that others made, the gods punish Narcissus by making him fall in love with his own reflection in a pool of water. When Narcissus discovers that the object of his love cannot love him back, he slowly pines away and dies.

The concept of excessive selfishness has been recognized throughout history. In ancient Greece, the concept was understood as hubris.

It was not until the late 19th century that narcissism began to be defined in psychological terms. Since that time, the term has had a significant divergence in meaning in psychology. It has been used to describe:

- A sexual perversion,
- A normal developmental stage,
- A symptom in psychosis, and
- A characteristic in several of the object relations [subtypes].

In 1889, psychiatrists Paul Näcke and Havelock Ellis used the term "narcissism", independently of each other, to describe a person who treats their own body in the same way in which the body of a sexual partner is ordinarily treated. Narcissism, in this context, was seen as a perversion that consumed a person's entire sexual life. In 1911 Otto Rank published the first clinical paper about narcissism, linking it to vanity and self-admiration.

In an essay in 1913 called "The God Complex: The Belief That One Is God and the Resulting Character Traits", Ernest Jones considered extreme narcissism as a character trait. He described people with the god complex as being aloof, self-important, overconfident, auto-erotic, inaccessible, self-admiring, and exhibitionistic, with fantasies of omnipotence and omniscience. He observed that these people had a high need for uniqueness.

Sigmund Freud (1914) published his theory of narcissism in a lengthy essay titled "On Narcissism: An Introduction". For Freud, narcissism refers to the individual's direction of libidinal energy toward themselves rather than objects and others. He postulated a universal "primary narcissism", that was a phase of sexual development in early infancy – a necessary intermediate stage between auto-eroticism and object-love, love for others. Portions of this 'self-love' or ego-libido are, at later stages of development, expressed outwardly, or "given off" toward others. Freud's postulation of a "secondary narcissism" came as a result of his observation of the peculiar nature of the schizophrenic's relation to themselves and the world. He observed that the two fundamental qualities of such patients were megalomania and withdrawal of interest from the real world of people and things: "the libido that has been withdrawn from the external world has been directed to the ego and thus gives rise to an attitude which may be called narcissism."

In 1925, Robert Waelder conceptualized narcissism as a personality trait. His definition described individuals who are condescending, feel superior to others, are preoccupied with admiration, and exhibit a lack of empathy. His patient was a successful scientist with an attitude of superiority, an obsession with fostering self-respect, and a lack of normal feelings of guilt. The patient was aloof and independent from others, had an inability to empathize with others, and was selfish sexually. Waelder's patient was also overly logical and analytical and valued abstract intellectual thought over the practical application of scientific knowledge.

Karen Horney (1939) postulated that narcissism was on a spectrum that ranged from healthy self-esteem to a pathological state.

The term entered the broader social consciousness following the publication of The Culture of Narcissism by Christopher Lasch in 1979. Since then, social media, bloggers, and self-help authors have indiscriminately applied "narcissism" as a label for the self-serving and for all domestic abusers.

== Expressions ==
=== Primary expressions ===
Two primary expressions of narcissism have been identified: grandiose ("thick-skinned") and vulnerable ("thin-skinned"). Recent accounts posit that the core of narcissism is self-centred antagonism (or "entitled self-importance"), namely selfishness, entitlement, lack of empathy, and devaluation of others. Grandiosity and vulnerability are seen as different expressions of this antagonistic core, arising from individual differences in the strength of the approach and avoidance motivational systems. Kowalchyk, Palmieri, Conte, and Wallisch have posited that genuine narcissists may fall into the vulnerable narcissism subtype, whereas grandiose narcissism might be a form of psychopathy.

==== Grandiose narcissism ====
Narcissistic grandiosity is thought to arise from a combination of the antagonistic core with temperamental boldness—defined by positive emotionality, social dominance, reward-seeking and risk-taking. Grandiosity is defined—in addition to antagonism—by a confident, exhibitionistic and manipulative self-regulatory style:

1. High self-esteem and a clear sense of uniqueness and superiority, with fantasies of success and power, and lofty ambitions.
2. Social potency, marked by exhibitionistic, authoritative, charismatic and self-promoting interpersonal behaviors.
3. Exploitative, self-serving relational dynamics; short-term relationship transactions defined by manipulation and privileging of personal gain over other benefits of socialization.

==== Vulnerable narcissism ====
Narcissistic vulnerability is thought to arise from a combination of the antagonistic core with temperamental reactivity—defined by negative emotionality, social avoidance, passivity and marked proneness to rage. Vulnerability is defined—in addition to antagonism—by a shy, vindictive and needy self-regulatory style:

1. Low and contingent self-esteem, unstable and unclear sense of self, and resentment of others' success
2. Social withdrawal, resulting from shame, distrust of others' intentions, and concerns over being accepted
3. Needy, obsessive relational dynamics; long-term relationship transactions defined by an excessive need for admiration, approval and support, and vengefulness when needs are unmet

=== Other expressions ===
==== Sexual ====
Sexual narcissism has been described as an egocentric pattern of sexual behavior that involves an inflated sense of sexual ability or sexual entitlement, sometimes in the form of extramarital affairs. This can be overcompensation for low self-esteem or an inability to sustain true intimacy.

While this behavioral pattern is believed to be more common in men than in women, it occurs in both men and women who compensate for feelings of sexual inadequacy by becoming overly proud or obsessed with their masculinity or femininity.

The controversial condition referred to as "sexual addiction" is believed by some experts to be sexual narcissism or sexual compulsivity, rather than an addictive behavior.

==== Parental ====
Narcissistic parents often see their children as extensions of themselves and encourage the children to act in ways that support the parents' emotional and self-esteem needs. Due to their vulnerability, children may be significantly affected by this behavior. To meet the parents' needs, the child may sacrifice their own wants and feelings. A child subjected to this type of parenting may struggle in adulthood with their intimate relationships.

In extreme situations, this parenting style can result in estranged relationships with the children, coupled with feelings of resentment, and in some cases, self-destructive tendencies.

Origins of narcissism in children can often come from the social learning theory. The social learning theory proposes that social behavior is learned by observing and imitating others' behavior. This suggests that children are anticipated to grow up to be narcissistic when their parents overvalue them.

==== Workplace ====
There is a compulsion of some professionals to constantly assert their competence, even when they are wrong. Professional narcissism can lead otherwise capable, and even exceptional, professionals to fall into narcissistic traps. "Most professionals work on cultivating a self that exudes authority, control, knowledge, competence and respectability. It's the narcissist in us all—we dread appearing stupid or incompetent."

Executives are often provided with potential narcissistic triggers. Inanimate triggers include status symbols like company cars, company-issued smartphone, or prestigious offices with window views; animate triggers include flattery and attention from colleagues and subordinates.

Narcissism has been linked to a range of potential leadership problems ranging from poor motivational skills to risky decision making, and in extreme cases, white-collar crime. High-profile corporate leaders that place an extreme emphasis on profits may yield positive short-term benefits for their organizations, but ultimately drag down individual employees as well as entire companies.

Subordinates may find everyday offers of support swiftly turn them into enabling sources, unless they are very careful to maintain proper boundaries.

Studies examining the role of personality in the rise to leadership have shown that individuals who rise to leadership positions can be described as inter-personally dominant, extraverted, and socially skilled. When examining the correlation of narcissism in the rise to leadership positions, narcissists who are often inter-personally dominant, extraverted, and socially skilled, were also likely to rise to leadership but were more likely to emerge as leaders in situations where they were not known, such as in outside hires (versus internal promotions). Paradoxically, narcissism can present as characteristics that facilitate an individual's rise to leadership, and ultimately lead that person to underachieve or even to fail.

Narcissism can also create problems in the general workforce. For example, individuals high in narcissism inventories are more likely to engage in counterproductive behavior that harms organizations or other people in the workplace. Aggressive (and counterproductive) behaviors tend to surface when self-esteem is threatened. Individuals high in narcissism have fragile self-esteem and are easily threatened. One study found that employees who are high in narcissism are more likely to perceive the behaviors of others in the workplace as abusive and threatening than individuals who are low in narcissism.

==== Relationships ====
Narcissism can have a profound impact on both personal and professional relationships, often creating toxic dynamics. In romantic relationships, narcissistic individuals typically demand attention and admiration from their partner while offering little in return. They often fail to show empathy or concern for their partner's emotional needs, focusing instead on fulfilling their own desires. The narcissist's behavior can shift dramatically, alternating between idealizing their partner—viewing them as perfect—and devaluing them when the narcissist no longer feels validated. This inconsistency can cause emotional confusion and distress for the partner, leaving them feeling undervalued and emotionally drained.

==== Celebrity ====
Celebrity narcissism (sometimes referred to as acquired situational narcissism) is a form of narcissism that develops in late adolescence or adulthood, brought on by wealth, fame and the other trappings of celebrity. Celebrity narcissism develops after childhood, and is triggered and supported by the celebrity-obsessed society. Fans, assistants and tabloid media all play into the idea that the person really is vastly more important than other people, triggering a narcissistic problem that might have been only a tendency, or latent, and helping it to become a full-blown personality disorder. "Robert Millman says that what happens to celebrities is that they get so used to people looking at them that they stop looking back at other people." In its most extreme presentation and symptoms, it is indistinguishable from narcissistic personality disorder, differing only in its late onset and its environmental support by large numbers of fans. "The lack of social norms, controls, and of people centering them makes these people believe they're invulnerable".

==== Social media ====
Social media has played a significant role in shaping and amplifying narcissistic behaviors in recent years. Platforms such as Instagram and TikTok encourage users to share content that emphasizes their personal achievements and appearance, often rewarding those who gain the most likes and followers. Narcissistic individuals are more likely to use these platforms for self-promotion and validation. The trend of posting selfies and curated images is particularly prevalent among individuals who seek external approval to boost their self-esteem. The constant feedback from social media algorithms, which prioritize highly engaging content, further fuels narcissistic tendencies. While this can lead to increased attention and admiration, it can also create emotional instability. Narcissists often experience negative feelings, such as anxiety or depression, when they do not receive the validation they expect. This pressure to maintain an idealized online persona can lead to emotional distress, especially when their real-world interactions do not match the image they present online.

== Levels ==
=== Normal and healthy levels of narcissism ===
Some psychologists suggest that a moderate level of narcissism is supportive of good psychological health. Self-esteem works as a mediator between narcissism and psychological health. Elevated self-esteem, in moderation, supports resilience and ambition, but excessive self-focus can distort social relationships.

=== Destructive levels of narcissism ===
While narcissism, in and of itself, can be considered a normal personality trait, high levels of narcissistic behavior can be harmful to both self and others. On a spectrum, destructive narcissism is more extreme than healthy narcissism but not as extreme as the pathological condition.

=== Pathological levels of narcissism ===
Extremely high levels of narcissistic behavior are considered pathological. It manifests itself in the inability to love others, lack of empathy, emptiness, boredom, and an unremitting need to search for power, while making the person unavailable to others. The clinical theorists Kernberg, Kohut, and Theodore Millon all saw pathological narcissism as a possible outcome in response to unempathetic and inconsistent early childhood interactions. They suggested that narcissists try to compensate in adult relationships. German psychoanalyst Karen Horney (1885–1952) also saw the narcissistic personality as a temperament trait molded by a certain kind of early environment.

== Causes ==
The mechanisms and aetiology of narcissistic traits remain unclear, but researchers have examined the role of genetics, childhood experiences, evolutionary and neurobiological factors.

=== Heritability and environment ===
Heritability studies using twins have shown that narcissistic traits, as measured by standardized tests, are often inherited. Narcissism was found to have a high heritability score (0.64) indicating that the concordance of this trait in the identical twins was significantly influenced by genetics as compared to an environmental causation. Studies have generally found that global indices of narcissism are generally moderately heritable (37-77%).

Furthermore, evidence suggests that individual elements of narcissism have their own heritability score.

- For example, the generally adaptive, intrapersonal grandiosity has a heritability score of 0.23, while maladaptive, interpersonal entitlement has a score of 0.35.
- Mirroring these results, adaptive traits of narcissism in general (grandiosity, dominance) was 37% heritable, while maladaptive/antagonistic traits in general (e.g., entitlement, exploitativeness) were 44% heritable.
- Agentic and communal narcissism - grandiosity and status-seeking on the basis of agentic (intelligence, achievement, dominance) and communal values (compassion, altruism, warmth), respectively - have scores of 0.25 and 0.47.

In all cases, the genetic and environmental factors associated with each trait are largely unique and non-overlapping, indicating different causes.

=== Childhood experiences ===
Some research has attempted to connect narcissism, especially pathological narcissism, to adverse childhood experiences (ACE). A 2024 meta-analysis found that vulnerable narcissism showed a small-to-moderate association with various ACEs, especially emotional neglect. Research also consistently supports an association between antagonistic aspects of narcissism (common to both grandiosity and vulnerability) and multiple ACEs, including abuse, neglect, low supervision, instability and household dysfunction. The adaptive features unique to grandiose narcissism tend to be positively correlated, albeit weakly, with parental warmth. Grandiosity is sometimes associated with parental overvaluation (especially in children with high self-esteem), but results have been inconsistent.

=== Evolutionary and neurobiological factors ===
Grandiose narcissism has been consistently positively associated with grey matter volume of brain regions connected to self-enhancement, reward and social dominance (e.g. orbitofrontal cortex, medial prefrontal cortex, striatal regions) as well as empathy (e.g. insula) and executive function (e.g. dorsolateral prefrontal cortex, anterior cingulate), possibly accounting for narcissism's link to aggression and risk-taking. Vulnerable narcissism shows the opposite association with structural properties (cortical thickness and volume) in some of the same areas.

Grandiose narcissism is associated with high testosterone at rest and in response to social challenge, where it relates to increased aggression.

There is increasing support for an hierometer theory, which suggests that grandiose narcissism in particular serves the evolutionary function of allowing individuals to navigate status hierarchies. Experimental and longitudinal studies demonstrate that levels of perceived status (feeling respected and admired) or status-relevant attributes (e.g. intelligence, competence) are causally related to narcissistic self-regard, with increases in status-related perceptions increasing grandiosity and assertive behaviour, while decreases promote reductions in narcissism and more acquiescent behaviour.

== Dark triad ==
Narcissism is one of the three traits in the dark triad model. The dark triad of personality traits – narcissism, Machiavellianism, and psychopathy – shows how narcissism relates to manipulative behaviors and a lack of empathy. Narcissism has variously been correlated with both traits, though psychologists such as Delroy Paulhus and Kevin Williams see enough evidence that it is a distinct trait. However, researchers who criticize the dark triad model point out that many of the theoretical traits said to distinguish psychopathy, Machiavellianism, and narcissism from one another do not appear in empirical research.

The dark tetrad, also known as the "dark quad", expands the dark triad with the addition of sadism which is consistent with the observation of lack of empathy among this suite of personalities. Sadism refers to the pleasure derived from the pain or humiliation of another. Sadism tracks with the satisfaction these personalities derive from extracting "narcissistic supply" from their targets which involves psychological abuse.

== Collective narcissism ==
Collective narcissism is a type of narcissism where an individual has an inflated self-love of their own group. While the classic definition of narcissism focuses on the individual, collective narcissism asserts that one can have a similar excessively high opinion of a group, and that a group can function as a narcissistic entity. Collective narcissism is related to ethnocentrism; however, ethnocentrism primarily focuses on self-centeredness at an ethnic or cultural level, while collective narcissism is extended to any type of ingroup beyond just cultures and ethnicities.

== Normalization of narcissistic behaviors ==
Some commentators contend that the American populace has become increasingly narcissistic since the end of World War II. According to sociologist Charles Derber, people pursue and compete for attention on an unprecedented scale. The profusion of popular literature about "listening" and "managing those who talk constantly about themselves" suggests its pervasiveness in everyday life. The growth of media phenomena such as "reality TV" programs and social media is generating a "new era of public narcissism".

Also supporting the contention that American culture has become more narcissistic is an analysis of US popular song lyrics between 1987 and 2007. This found a growth in the use of first-person singular pronouns, such as I, me, my, and mine, reflecting a greater focus on the self, and also of references to antisocial behavior; during the same period, there was a diminution of words reflecting a focus on others, positive emotions, and social interactions. References to narcissism and self-esteem in American popular print media have experienced vast inflation since the late 1980s. Between 1987 and 2007 direct mentions of self-esteem in leading US newspapers and magazines increased by 4,540 percent while narcissism, which had been almost non-existent in the press during the 1970s, was referred to over 5,000 times between 2002 and 2007.

Narcissism can be identified, among other things, through the use of hyperbolic communication and language.

=== Individualistic vs collectivist national cultures ===
Similar patterns of change in cultural production are observable in other Western states. For example, a linguistic analysis of the largest circulation Norwegian newspaper found that the use of self-focused and individualistic terms increased in frequency by 69 per cent between 1984 and 2005 while collectivist terms declined by 32 per cent.

One study looked at differences in advertising between an individualistic culture, United States, and a collectivist culture, South Korea and found that in the US there was a greater tendency to stress the distinctiveness and uniqueness of the person; whereas advertising in South Korean stressed the importance of social conformity and harmony. These cultural differences were greater than the effects of individual differences within national cultures.

== Controversies ==
There has been an increased interest in narcissism and narcissistic personality disorder (NPD) in the last 10 years. There are areas of substantial debate that surround the subject including:

- Clearly defining the difference between normal and pathological narcissism,
- Understanding the role of self-esteem in narcissism,
- Reaching a consensus on the classifications and definitions of sub-types such as "grandiose" and "vulnerable dimensions" or variants of these,
- Understanding what are the central versus peripheral, primary versus secondary features/characteristics of narcissism,
- Determining if there is consensual description,
- Agreeing on the etiological factors,
- Deciding what field or discipline narcissism should be studied by,
- Agreeing on how it should be assessed and measured, and
- Agreeing on its representation in textbooks and classification manuals.

This extent of the controversy was on public display in 2010–2013 when the committee on personality disorders for the 5th Edition (2013) of the Diagnostic and Statistical Manual of Mental Disorders recommended the removal of Narcissistic Personality from the manual. A contentious three-year debate unfolded in the clinical community with one of the sharpest critics being John G. Gunderson, the person who led the DSM personality disorders committee for the 4th edition of the manual.

== See also ==
- Empathy – Ability to understand or feel what another is feeling
- Entitlement – Sense of being owed something without cause
- Grandiosity – Unrealistic sense of superiority and of uniqueness
- Self-esteem – Human emotional need
