= Psychiatric Quarterly =

- Discipline: Psychiatry
- Language: English
- Edited by: Jonathan M. DePierro, PhD

Publication details
- Former name: The State Hospital Quarterly
- History: 1915-present
- Publisher: Springer Science+Business Media
- Frequency: Quarterly
- Impact factor: 2.6 (2025)

Standard abbreviations
- ISO 4: Psychiatr. Q.

Indexing
- CODEN: PSQUAP
- ISSN: 0033-2720 (print); 1573-6709 (web)
- OCLC no.: 01715671

Links
- Journal homepage; Online access

The Psychiatric Quarterly is a peer-reviewed medical journal that was established in 1915 as The State Hospital Quarterly (OCLC 297361895 and OCLC 559984281). It obtained its current name in 1927. The publication's founding editor-in-chief was Horatio Pollock.

== Abstracting and indexing ==
The journal is abstracted and indexed in the Science Citation Index, PubMed, and EMBASE, among others. According to the Journal Citation Reports, the journal has a 2010 impact factor of 1.327, ranking it 62nd out of 110 journals in the category "Psychiatry".

== In popular culture ==
In the 2002 episode "Surprise!" of the program Greg the Bunny, it is revealed that character Dottie Sunshine is a reader of Psychiatric Quarterly.
