= Richard C. Friedman =

American psychiatrist (1941–2020)

Richard C. Friedman (January 20, 1941 – March 31, 2020) was an academic psychiatrist, a Clinical Professor of Psychiatry at Weill Cornell Medical College, and a faculty member at Columbia University. He has conducted research in the endocrinology and the psychodynamics of homosexuality, especially within the context of psychoanalysis. Friedman was born in The Bronx, New York.

== Medical career ==
Friedman studied at Bard College in the early 1960s, received his MD from the University of Rochester in 1966 and completed his psychiatric residency at Columbia University in 1970, following which he spent two years with the United States Army Medical Corps working in the psychiatric department of William Beaumont Army Medical Center in El Paso, Texas, with the rank of Major. He later worked at several hospitals in New York City while teaching at Columbia University and, from 1977, Cornell University. He was appointed to the faculty at Columbia in 1978 and appointed Lecturer in Psychiatry in 1994; at Cornell, he was appointed the Clinical Professor of Psychiatry in 1996. He held both posts concurrently with that of research professor of psychology at the Derner Institute, Adelphi University (appointed 1989).

== Research ==
Friedman's early research was on deprivation experienced by physicians in training. He was the first person to demonstrate that sleep deprivation impaired the capacity of medical doctors in hospitals to function adequately. His later psychiatric research looked at sexuality; he was one of the coauthors of Sexuality: New Perspectives (1985), which addressed sex roles and sexual disorders in women.

He then studied the issues surrounding the way homosexuality was handled by conventional psychoanalysis; in his book Male Homosexuality (1988) Friedman was the first to combine recent findings in psychobiology, gender identity, and family studies with psychoanalytic theory. Friedman challenged the way that the Freudian theory of the Oedipus complex was used by psychoanalysts at that time. He noted that erotic desire for the opposite-sexed parent was not universal and that homosexuality was not a symptomatic response to unconscious fears of heterosexuality. Friedman concluded that homosexuality was not pathological, and should not be treated as a condition to be cured. The book had a major impact on the field and led to significant changes in the way psychoanalysts and psychotherapists understand and treat non-heterosexual patients.

He later wrote Sexual Orientation and Psychoanalysis (2002), co-authored with Jennifer I. Downey, which focuses on the role of psychoanalysis in the understanding of sexual orientation in both sexes. This book discusses in particular detail the role played by psychotherapy in ameliorating the long-term effects of anti-homosexual prejudice. More recently, Friedman and Downey were the first to study the relevance of sexual differentiation of behavior to psychoanalytic theory and practice, arguing that the psychoanalytic approach to psychological development and functioning needed widespread revision.

Friedman was a member of the American Psychiatric Association DSM-III advisory committee for psychosexual disorders and a consultant to the DSM-IV advisory board for gender identity disorders. He was on the editorial board of Archives of Sexual Behavior, and was the editor of Psychodynamic Psychiatry, the official journal of the American Academy of Psychoanalysis and Dynamic Psychiatry. He received the Mary S. Sigourney Award in 2009 from the Sigourney Trust in recognition of distinguished contributions to the field of psychoanalysis. He died on March 31, 2020, at the age of 79 in Manhattan.

== Selected publications ==
- Friedman RC, Bigger JT, Kornfeld DS (1971). "The intern and sleep loss". The New England Journal of Medicine. 285 (4): 201–203. doi:10.1056/NEJM197107222850405. PMID 5087723.
- Friedman, R.C., Richard, R.M., and Vande Wiele, R.L. (eds.) (1974). Sex Differences in Behavior. New York: John Wiley & Sons.
- Friedman, R.C. (ed.) (1982). Behavior and the Menstrual Cycle. New York: Marcel Dekker, Inc.
- DeFries, Z., Friedman, R.C., and Corn, R. (eds.) (1985). Sexuality: New Perspectives. Conn.: Greenwood Press.
- Friedman, RC (1988). Male Homosexuality: A Contemporary Psychoanalytic Perspective. New Haven, Conn.: Yale University Press.
- Friedman, R.C. and Downey, J.I. (eds.) (1999). Masculinity and Sexuality: Selected Topics in the Psychology of Men, Annual Review Series (J. Oldham, M. Riba, and A. Tasman, eds.). Washington, D.C.: American Psychiatric Press, Inc.
- Friedman, RC; Downey JI (2002). Sexual Orientation and Psychoanalysis: Sexual Science and Clinical Practice. New York: Columbia University Press.
- 2008 edition published as Sexual Orientation and Psychodynamic Psychotherapy: Sexual Science and Clinical Practice.
