= Daniel Stern (psychologist) =

American infant psychoanalyst (1934-2012)

Daniel N. Stern (August 16, 1934 – November 12, 2012) was a prominent American developmental psychiatrist and psychoanalyst, specializing in infant development, on which he had written a number of books — most notably The Interpersonal World of the Infant (1985).

Stern's 1985 and 1995 research and conceptualization created a bridge between psychoanalysis and research-based developmental models.

== Biography ==
Stern was born in New York City. He went to Harvard University as an undergraduate, from 1952 to 1956. He then attended Albert Einstein College of Medicine, completing his M.D. in 1960. In 1961, Stern was member of the Freedom Riders, a group of black and white activists challenging racial segregation in the south by traveling together on bus rides.

He continued his educational career doing research at the NIH in psychopharmacology from 1962 to 1964. In 1964, Stern decided to specialize in psychiatric care, completing his residency at Columbia University College of Physicians and Surgeons. In 1972 he started a psychoanalytic education at Columbia University Center for Psychoanalytic Training and Research.

For more than 30 years, he worked in research and practice as well in developmental psychology and psychodynamic psychotherapy.

Through much of his career, Stern worked in New York City as a professor at Weill Cornell Medicine and a lecturer at Columbia University Center for Psychoanalytic Training and Research.

At the time of his death, Stern was a psychiatry professor at the University of Geneva, adjunct professor at the Cornell University Medical School and a lecturer at the Columbia University Center for Psychoanalytic Training and Research.

He received Honorary Doctorates from the Universities of Copenhagen (2002), Palermo, Mons Hainaut, Aalborg, Padova, and Stockholm University. He was a fellow of the Norwegian Academy of Science and Letters from 2004.

He died, aged 78, in Geneva, Switzerland, following a heart failure. He had actively contributed to the ongoing work of the Boston Process of Change Study Group only a few months prior.

== Theoretical contributions ==
Stern's most prominent works consider the area of motherhood and infants.

=== The layered self ===
(1) In The Interpersonal World of the Infant, Stern proposed that an infant develops in a series of overlapping and interdependent stages or layers, which are increasingly interpersonally sophisticated. He distinguished four main senses of self: 'the sense of an emergent self, which forms from birth to age two months, the sense of a core self, which forms between the ages of two and six months, the sense of a subjective self, which forms between seven and fifteen months, and a sense of a verbal self'.

The emergent sense gathers together the earliest 'sense of physical cohesion (..."going on being", in Winnicott's term)'.

In the 'next life period, age two to seven months, the infant gains enough experience...[to] create an organizing subjective perspective that can be called a sense of a core self'. At this stage, while intensely involved in social interaction with the [m]other, essentially 'the other is a self-regulating other for the infant...one who regulates the infant.'

Thereafter, at the next stage of the subjective self, 'for there to be an intersubjective exchange about affect...the mother must go beyond true imitations, which have been an enormous and important part of her social repertoire during the first six months or so', and develop 'a theme-and-variation format...purposeful misattunements'.

Finally, during the second year of the infant's life language emerges', to provide for a verbal self — creating thereby 'a new domain of relatedness', but one which 'moves relatedness onto the impersonal, abstract level intrinsic to language and away from the personal, immediate level'.

(2) In a later edition of The Interpersonal World — 'revisiting a book written fifteen years earlier' — Stern added two more layers to his hierarchy of the self: the 'core self-with-another' preceding the subjective self; and finally the 'narrative self, or selves', developing out of the verbal self.

Highlighting the setting of the narrative self in what he called 'The World of Stories', Stern emphasized how the capacity for 'interpreting the world of human activities in terms of story plots...psychological explanations embedded in the structure of a narrative...unfolds according to a genetically determined timetable' around the age of three or four. On the positive side, 'the child, narrating an autobiographical story...is creating his identity'; on the negative side, however, possibilities for distortion, and for the consolidation of a false self, also emerge at this time: 'if the lived past and the narrated past are very discrepant...story making can establish and perpetuate distortions of reality – distortions that contribute significantly to mental disturbance'.

=== The motherhood constellation ===
In The Motherhood Constellation, Stern describes a mother's instinctual focus on and devotion to her infant as being critical to the child's development. Psychoanalytic support could take the form of '"the good grandmother transference"...appropriate to the motherhood constellation'.

=== Proto-narratives ===
In 1995; he introduced the term "proto-narrative envelope." "This 'envelope,'" Person et al. write, "contains experience organized with the structure of a narrative. But...a story without words or symbols, a plot visible only through the perceptual, affective, and motoric strategies to which it gives rise". Stern stressed how early experiences of mother-child interaction 'have a beginning, a middle, and an end and a line of dramatic tension; they are tiny narratives ... 'proto-narrative envelopes'.'
He described "ports of entry" in terms of intervention to affect change in the relationship of mother and infant. These are the mother's view of herself, the mother's view of the infant, the infant's view of her/himself, and the infant's view of the mother. All of these are to be considered when designing an intervention strategy for a dysfunctional dyadic relationship.

== Psychoanalytic controversies and wider influences ==
- 'For the debate between psychoanalytic and behaviouristic accounts of mother-infant relating, and a range of responses to their theoretical differences, see the argument between André Green and Daniel Stern, Clinical and Observational Psychoanalytic Research: Roots of a Controversy (London 2000)'.
- As an analyst, Stern identified himself as 'post-Freudian', in terms of his emphasis on 'creating transference/countertransference conditions that allow for a new and better experience of self in relationship with others' — thus relying less on interpretation of the past, and 'more on the object relations aspect (corrective attachment experiences) and on self-psychology (empathic availability and self-esteem)'.
- The prominent critical theorist and psychologist Félix Guattari draws extensively from Daniel Stern's Interpersonal World of the Infant to produce a theory of subjectivity and pre-linguistic consciousness in his book Chaosmose. In explaining Stern's idea, Guattari says, "[Daniel Stern] has notably explored the pre-verbal subjective formations of infants. He shows that these are not at all a matter of "stages" in the Freudian sense, but levels of subjectivation which maintain themselves in parallel throughout life. He thus rejects the overrated psychogenesis of Freudian complexes, which have been presented as structural "Universals" of subjectivity. Furthermore, he emphasizes the inherently trans-subjective character of an infant's early experiences, which do not dissociate the feeling of self from the feeling of the other."

== Bibliography ==
- The First Relationship: Infant and Mother (1977)
- The Interpersonal World of the Infant: A View from Psychoanalysis and Development (1985)and (1998). ISBN 978-0-465-03403-1
- Diary of a Baby (1990)
- Motherhood Constellation: A Unified View of Parent-Infant Psychotherapy (1995)
- The Birth of a Mother (with Nadia Bruschweiler-Stern) (1997)
- Face-to-face play. In Jaffe, J., Beebe, B., Feldstein, S., Crown, C. & Jasnow, M.D. (Eds.), Rhythms of dialogue in infancy: Coordinated timing in development. Monographs of the society for research in child development (Vol. 66). Ann Arbor, MI: SRCD (2001)
- The Present Moment in Psychotherapy and Everyday Life (WW Norton & Company, 2004).
- Forms of Vitality: Exploring Dynamic Experience in Psychology and the Arts (2010)

== See also ==
- Stern's tripartite self
