= Robert Millman =

American physician

Robert B. Millman (August 25, 1939 – August 14, 2017), was an American physician and former Saul Steinberg Professor of Psychiatry and Public Health at Weill Cornell Medical College, where he was the Director of the Drug and Alcohol Abuse Treatment and Research Service at New York-Presbyterian Hospital. He served in this role from 1987, until his retirement in 2009. Millman counseled and helped many people deal with and overcome addiction from his office on east 35th Street in New York. Millman was the author of more than 100 scientific papers and book chapters and an editor of the Comprehensive Textbook of Substance Abuse. He was a member of the Board of Directors of Drug Strategies, a national non-profit research institute that promotes effective drug abuse prevention, education, and treatment, and an advisor to the State and Federal Governments. He was the former Medical Director for Major League Baseball, where he was an advisor on performance-enhancing supplements and steroids. Robert was well respected and liked by both his patients and colleagues.

Millman graduated from Cornell and received his medical degree from the State University of New York, SUNY Downstate Medical Center in Brooklyn. He was trained in internal medicine at the New York Hospital and Cornell Medical College and then in psychiatry at Cornell's Payne Whitney Psychiatric Clinic. He began his research career at the Rockefeller University, in the laboratory of Vincent Dole.

== Acquired situational narcissism ==
Acquired situational narcissism (ASN) is a proposed form of narcissism that develops in late adolescence or adulthood, brought on by wealth, fame and the other trappings of celebrity. The concept was coined by Robert B. Millman.

ASN differs from conventional narcissism in that it develops after childhood and is triggered and supported by the celebrity-obsessed society: fans, assistants and tabloid media all play into the idea that the person really is vastly more important than other people, triggering a narcissistic problem that might have been only a tendency, or latent, and helping it to become a full-blown personality disorder. "Millman says that what happens to celebrities is that they get so used to people looking at them that they stop looking back at other people."

In its presentation and symptoms, it is indistinguishable from narcissistic personality disorder, differing only in its late onset and its support by large numbers of others. "The lack of social norms, controls, and of people telling them how life really is, also makes these people believe they're invulnerable," so that the person with ASN may suffer from unstable relationships, substance abuse and erratic behaviour.
