= Roy Schafer =

American psychologist and psychoanalysis

Roy Schafer (December 14, 1922, New York City – August 5, 2018, Pequannock) was an American psychologist and psychoanalyst, who emphasised a psychoanalytic concept of narrative. For Schafer, an important purpose of the analytic process is that the analysand regains agency of their own story and of their own life. Psychoanalyst and analysand each have a role in telling and retelling the analysand's life story: the analyst helps the analysand by elevating subjectivity as awareness of multiple interpretations.

== Biography ==
Roy Schafer was trained at the Menninger Foundation and Austen Riggs Center, then became Chief psychologist in the Yale Medical School Department of Psychiatry (1953–1961), subsequently a staff psychologist for Yale’s health service (1961–1976) during which time he was appointed Clinical Professor, and later Training and Supervising Analyst in the Western New England Institute for Psychoanalysis (1968). He was recruited to New York City to join the full-time faculty at Cornell University, Medical College in 1976. In 1979, he established a private practice in New York City. He remained a clinical professor at Weill Cornell Medical College and a Training and Supervising Analyst at the Columbia University Center for Psychoanalytic Training and Research since that time.

His early work focused on psychological testing. Melvin Belli called upon him as an expert witness for Jack Ruby, Lee Harvey Oswald's killer, whom he diagnosed as suffering organic brain damage that most likely involved psychomotor epilepsy. His first publications were on diagnostic psychological testing and included the very influential Psychoanalytic Interpretation in Rorschach Testing (1954). He later wrote on psychoanalysis and psychotherapy in works including Aspects of Internalization (1968), A New Language for Psychoanalysis (1976), The Analytic Attitude (1983), Retelling a Life (1992), The Contemporary Kleinians of London (1997), Bad Feelings (2003), Insight and Interpretation (2003), and Tragic Knots in Psychoanalysis (2009).

He has received many honors, ranging from First Sigmund Freud Memorial Professor University College London (1975–76) to the Outstanding Scientific Achievement Award of the International Psychoanalytic Association (2009).

== Interpretations of life stories ==
Schafer began to present traditional psychoanalytical concepts not as scientific principles but as interpretative storylines. In this view there is no single correct interpretation of a life story; rather, like other narrative constructions, such as poems or novels, the account lends itself to various understandings each of which can legitimately claim to be true while emphasizing another way of looking at it. According to Mitchell's alternative view of Schafer's work, the value of an interpretation lies not in its objectivity or correctness, but in its potential for opening up new forms of experience and allowing the analysand to claim a deeper and broader sense of its own activity.

=== Narrational process ===
A narrational process in psychoanalysis consists of two people: the psychoanalyst and the analysand. Roy Schafer prefers the use of the word analysand instead of patient to avoid the implication of disease. Schafer describes psychoanalysts as ‘retellers of narrations’, but he states that more descriptions of psychoanalysts are possible. The analyst's retelling influences the ‘what and how’ of the stories told by the analysand. The analyst establishes new questions that amount to narrative possibilities.

Schafer divides the narration of the analysand in two parts:

a) The analysand him- or herself. In the psychoanalytic situation, the psychoanalyst gives an account for the meaning an analysand gives to certain (life)events. In the analytical situation one needs to deal with excessive claiming or disclaiming. In psychoanalytic narration some people present themselves as regularly blaming themselves for being responsible for misfortunes and accidents in their lives; this is called excessive claiming of action. The opposite of claiming of action is disclaiming of action: many others view themselves regularly as passive victims of circumstances when in fact they have played a part in bringing about these circumstances.

b) Narration. Following literary theorists, who examined the role of telling and showing in narration, Roy Schafer makes a distinction between telling and showing in the psychoanalytical situation. Telling happens when the analysand tells in words about events; about the past. Showing happens when the analysand conveys ideas, feelings, fantasies or reactions, verbal or non-verbal and freely associates these in an unselective way and without rehearsal. The analysand seems to be operating in the present; even when talking about the past.

=== Agency ===
In Schafer's account the basic transformation in the analytic process is the analysand's gradual assumption of agency with respect to previously disclaimed actions. Initially the analysand considers her beliefs about herself and her world to simply be true. She has been crushed, the world is dangerous. These are taken as givens, objective facts. In analysis the analysand comes to see that these facts may have actually been in part created by her. She is the agent of her world, the designer, the interpreter. As the analysand comes to understand and experience herself as the agent of her internal and external world it becomes possible for her to imagine herself making other choices, acting in the world and organizing her experience in a more open more constructive fashion. Also to be taken into account, according to Schafer, is reducing excessive claims of agency as in irrational self-blaming.

=== Subjectivity ===
Another important aspect of Schafer concerning the use of narratives in the analytical situation is subjectivity. Subjectivity means that multiple interpretations are possible for one story. According to Schafer, psychopathology is the result of a lack of this multifaceted subjectivity, so the goal in the analytical situation is to expand subjectivity. The analyst does this by prescribing which parts of the whole story a patient tells are selected, in such a way that it can be transformed into a different story. One selects the details from the story whereby one constructs a new story which is relevant at that moment for the process in the psychoanalytic situation. A story changes at the moment new goals are formed. New questions are discussed and new points of view are created on the past. In this way, the analytical viewpoint on the past is a reconstruction of what happened in the past. The subject of the story is reconsidered, the story is told in a different way, the story gets a different context and a different interpretation. Hereby the reconstruction of childhood and past are interdependent. What seems to be a truth about the past at one moment, can become untrue or nuanced by new insights, which causes a new or more differentiated truth. In this way, the view on the past and the present are not separated, but interrelated. So, the analyst helps the analysand to view his story in a different light and this enriches the analysand's subjectivity.
