= Columbia University Center for Psychoanalytic Training and Research =

American organization for training psychoanalysts

Coordinates: 40.842631°N 73.944572°W

The Columbia University Center for Psychoanalytic Training and Research was founded in 1945. It is part of the Department of Psychiatry of the Columbia University College of Physicians and Surgeons.

== Training ==
It offers training in adult and child psychoanalysis, adult and child psychotherapy and parent-infant psychotherapy. Training is open to licensed psychiatrists and clinical psychologists. The center also offers low-cost psychoanalysis to people in New York.

== Members ==
Faculty members include psychiatrists and psychologists who specialize in American object relations theory, ego psychology, self psychology, Kleinian theory, attachment theory and neuropsychoanalysis. Several current and former members of its faculty are well known within psychoanalysis and psychiatry, including Fredric Busch, Susan Coates, Robert Glick, Otto Kernberg, Roger MacKinnon, Robert Michels, Robert Pollack, John Munder Ross, Roy Schafer, Daniel Schechter, Theodore Shapiro, Robert Spitzer, Eve Caligor, Deborah Cabaniss, Beatrice Beebe, Christine Anzieu-Premmereur, Abraham Kardiner, Sandor Rado, Daniel Stern, Arnold Cooper, Ethel Person, Richard Isay, Norman Doidge, among others. The current director is Justin Richardson who succeeded Susan C. Vaughan in 2023.

The center's trainees are a mix of clinical psychologists and psychiatrists. The curriculum averages 5 years and generally begins after the candidate has completed all other training (e.g., a psychiatry residency for physicians and clinical internships for psychologists). Candidates attend classes, conduct analyses, obtain supervision, and undergo their own analysis.
