= Susan C. Vaughan =

Psychologist, psychoanalyst and author

Susan C. Vaughan is an American author, psychiatrist and psychoanalyst. She serves as the director of the Columbia University Center for Psychoanalytic Training and Research (2017-), Vagelos College of Physicians and Surgeons, Columbia University.

Vaughan has written widely on gender, sexuality and the neuroscience behind psychotherapy. She is the author of three books: The Talking Cure: The Science Behind Psychotherapy, Half Empty, Half Full: Understanding the Psychological Roots of Optimism, and Viagra: A Guide to the Phenomenal Potency Promoting Drug.

== Education ==
Vaughan graduated from Harvard College and Columbia University College of Physicians and Surgeons.

== Selected publications ==
- Half Empty, Half Full Understanding the Psychological Roots of Optimism, Harcourt, New York, NY, 2000
- The Talking Cure The Science Behind Psychotherapy, Grosset/Putnam, 1998
- Psychoanalysis and Homosexuality: Do we need a new theory. J of Am Psychoanal. 2001;49: 1157–1186
- Scrambled Eggs. Psychological meanings of new reproductive choices for lesbians. J Infant Child Adolescent Psychotherapy 2007;6: 141-155
- The Dignity of One's Experience: Finding dignity in the lives of LGBTQ people. Chapter in Dignity, S. Akhtar, ed., Routledge, 2015
