= Cyrus Hamlin (professor) =

American academic (1936–2011)

- Born: 1936; New Haven, Connecticut
- Died: January 19, 2011 (aged 74–75)

Cyrus Hamlin (1936 – January 19, 2011) was a Yale professor emeritus who is well-recognized for his contributions to the study of European Romanticism and literary theory.

== Early life ==
Hamlin was born in New Haven, Connecticut and attended Phillips Exeter and Harvard College, where he graduated magna cum laude. He was a descendant of the Civil War general Cyrus Hamlin.

== Academic career ==
His lengthy academic career began at Yale, where he earned his doctorate in 1963. At the University of Toronto, he taught English and comparative literature for twelve years before returning to Yale in 1982, where he became an honorary member of Manuscript Society. Hamlin was an accomplished lecturer and visiting professor in a great many universities, including Boston University, University of California, San Diego, Oxford, Harvard, the Free University in Berlin, and the Universities of Heidelberg and Bologna.

His teaching focus was on Goethe, but it also covered many other literary forms and theories; among them were Wagner and Brecht's theater and opera, hermeneutics, Biblical literature, and Classical Greek literature. He retired from teaching in 2006.

Hamlin held quite a few administrative appointments, ranging from chairing the graduate program in comparative literature at the University of Toronto to directing the Special Programs in the Humanities to chairing committees for language studies and theater studies at Yale College. He was the co-founder of the undergraduate Program in Literary Studies, and served as president of the Elizabethan Club and the Manuscript Society, chair of the board of Jonathan Edwards Trust, and a member of the Beinecke Library Faculty Advisory Committee. In addition, he held the role of coordinator and moderator for the Stage-Talk Forums at Long Wharf Theater.

Early publications of his focused on the poetry of Friedrich Hölderlin, on Goethe's "Faust" and on the poetics of European Romanticism. Hamlin was the general editor of the Suhrkamp edition of Goethe in English in 12 volumes, and the editor with commentary of the Norton Critical Edition of Goethe's "Faust." His essays on the poetics of Romanticism are collected in a volume titled "Hermeneutics of Form" (1998), and most recently he co-edited "Symbolic Forms and Cultural Studies: Ernst Cassirer's Theory of Culture." As a passionate Wagnerian, he also wrote and lectured widely on Wagner's operas. Among his other projects were conducting a study of major cultural institutions founded in Berlin from 1810 to 1830, and writing a series of essays on the Bible as literature.

== Death ==
He died on January 19, 2011. A memorial service was held in Yale's Battell Chapel on February 19, 2011. In the summer of 2012, his ashes were buried in Somesville, Maine.
