= Michael Perelman (psychologist) =

Michael Allen Perelman
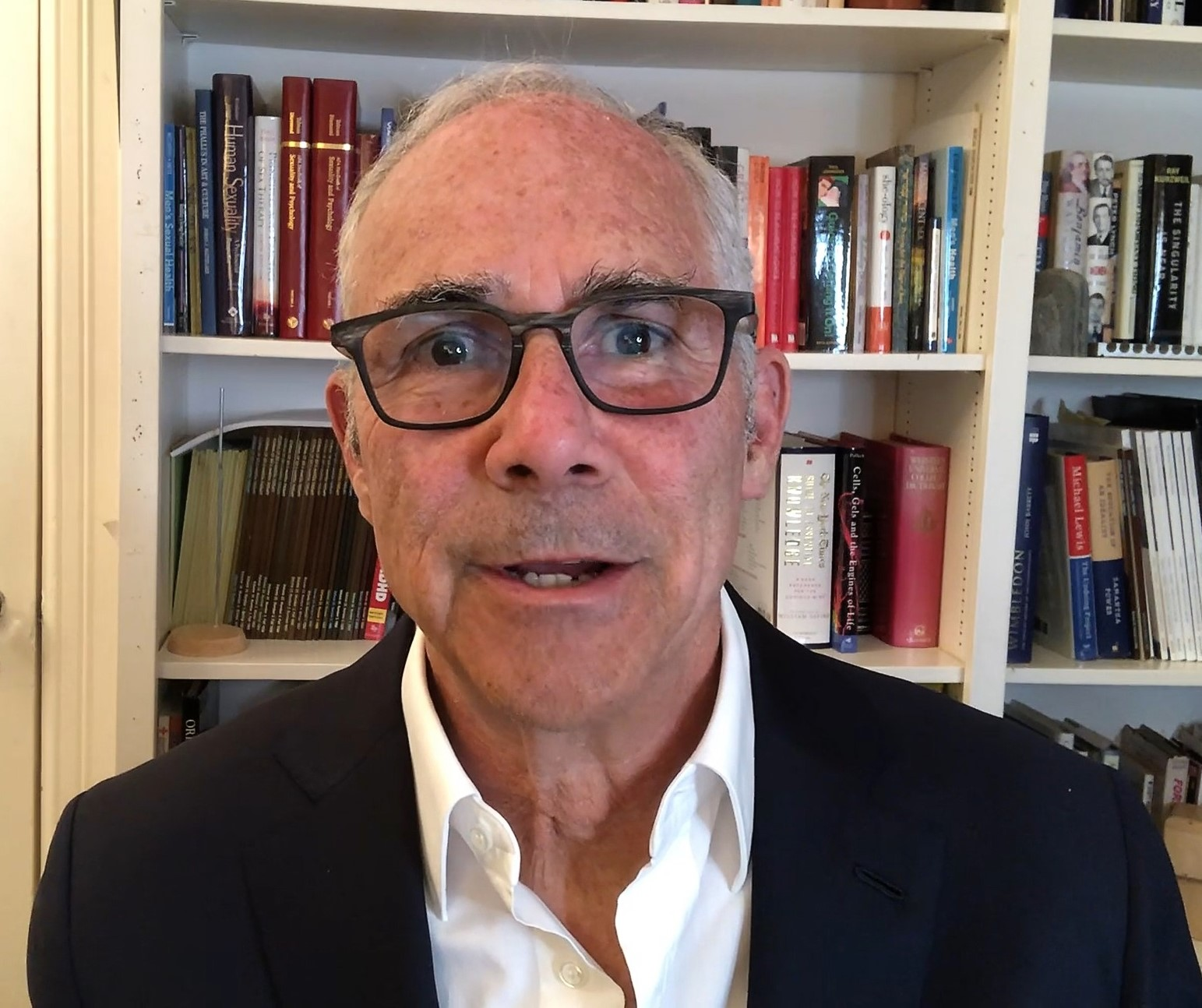
- Perelman in 2021
- Born: January 24, 1949 (age 77); Chicago
- Education: Columbia University
- Known for: Sex Therapist
- Scientific career
- Fields: Psychologist
- Workplaces: Weill Cornell Medicine; Payne Whitney Psychiatric Clinic
- Website: mapedfund.org

Michael A. Perelman is an American psychologist. He is a Clinical Professor Emeritus of Psychology in Psychiatry and former Clinical Professor of Reproductive Medicine, and Urology at Weill Cornell Medicine. Perelman is the co-director of the Human Sexuality Program, Payne Whitney Clinic of the NewYork–Presbyterian Hospital.

== Education ==
Perelman received his MS, M.Phil. and Ph.D. degrees in clinical psychology from Columbia University. Perelman was Chief Intern in Medical Psychology at Duke University Medical Center, followed by a Post-Doctoral Fellowship studying sex therapy with H.S. Kaplan.

== Career ==
Following decades as a Manhattan psychotherapist and academic, in 2012, Perelman founded the MAP Education and Research Foundation. The Foundation educates healthcare providers about the importance of maintaining a biomedical-psychosocial and cultural approach to the diagnosis, and treatment of sexual disorders. His trademark registered Sexual Tipping Point Model was donated to the Foundation.

Perelman is a former President of the Society for Sex Therapy and Research. He has been elected a Fellow of the Sexual Medicine Society of North America the International Society for Study of Women's Sexual Health, and the Society for the Scientific Study of Sexuality.

In a recent interview with the International Online Sexology Supervisors, Michael Perelman reflects on the evolution of sex therapy over the past half century, drawing on his extensive experience as both an observer and a catalyst of change in the field. Perelman stresses that simply imparting knowledge is not enough to effect real change in patients. As he notes, "You can't just beat your patients on the head with your knowledge and expect it to make a difference." Instead, successful therapy requires a holistic approach that combines deep understanding of the patient's unique situation with effective communication and problem-solving skills.

== Editorial ==
2018–Present Blogger/Contributor, Psychology Today, New York, NY; 2018–Present Italian Journal of Clinical Sexology, Scientific Board; 2017–Present Current Sexual Health Reports, Emeritus Editor in Chief, Springer [1], Editor in Chief (2013-2017) Editorial Board, (2006 – 2008), Editorial Advisory Board 2014–Present World Health Organization's Global Clinical Practice Network (GCPN); 2009–Present European Association of Urology (EAU) Guidelines, Reviewer; 2006–Present Urology, Reviewer; 2006–Present Journal of Sexual and Relationship Therapy, Reviewer; 2005–Present Journal of Urology, Reviewer; 2005–Present Journal of Andrology, Reviewer; 2004–Present Journal of Sexual Medicine, Editorial Board (2008-2011), Inter-journal Communications Chair (2007), Reviewer (2000–present); 2004 – Present, Sexual Dysfunction Section, Faculty of 1000 Medicine, Medicine Reports Ltd., Bio Med Central; 2001 – Present; International Journal of Impotence Research: The Journal of Sexual Medicine, Editorial Board (2011–present), Reviewer (2001–present); 1982 – Present, Journal of Sex and Marital Therapy, Consulting Editor; 2012 – 2016, Editor in Chief, Current Sexual Health Reports, Springer [2]; 2004 – 2013, British Journal of Urology International – Sexual Medicine Section, Editorial Board; 2006 – 2014 Sexual Health & Medicine, SMSNA Advisory Board; 2010 – 2013, American Psychiatric Association (ApA), Advisor, DSM-V Task Force & Work Group; 2008–2012, International Society for Sexual Medicine (ISSM) Newsbulletin, Ed. Board, 2009, European Society for Sexual Medicine, Guidelines on Male Sexual Dysfunction: Erectile Dysfunction and Premature Ejaculation, Reviewer; 2003 – 2009; 2998 – 2001, Pfizer Newsletter, Viagra Update: Urologist's Edition, Editorial Board; 1994 – 1997, Contemporary Urology, Department Editor, “Sex Therapy Today";1990 – 1992, Journal of Integrative & Eclectic Psychotherapy, Consulting Editor; 1978 – 1981, Journal of Sex Education and Therapy, Consulting Editor

== Awards ==
A. The American Association of Sex Educators, Counselors and Therapists (AASECT) presented Michael Perelman two Awards:

1. AASECT's Professional Standards of Excellence in 2012

Ref: https://www.aasect.org/professional-standard-excellence-award

2.AASECT Award for Integrative Sex Therapy in 2019

Ref: https://www.aasect.org/award-integrative-approaches-sex-therapy

B. Awarded in 2015, The American Psychological Association’s Div. 43 (Society for Family Psychology) presented him with the James W. Maddock Faculty Award.

Ref: https://news.weill.cornell.edu/news/2016/06/awards-and-honors-across-weill-cornell-medicine---week-of-may-27---june-3

C. Awarded the 2021 “Distinguished Sexual and Gender Health Revolutionary” Medal as selected by the University of Minnesota Medical School's Department of Family Medicine and Community Health's Program in Human Sexuality.

Ref: https://med.umn.edu/sites/med.umn.edu/files/annual_report_2021.pdf

D. The Sexual Medicine Society of North America presented Perelman with a Lifetime Achievement Award at the Scientific Meeting of the Sexual Medicine Society of North America & the International Society For Sexual Medicine (SMSNA/ISSM) during the Opening Ceremonies in Miami, FL on October 27, 2022.

Ref: https://www.smsna.org/about/awards/ronald-w-lewis-lifetime-achievement-award
