= Charles Derber =

American sociologist and political activist

- Born: Washington DC
- Education: Yale University
- Occupations: Professor of Sociology and author
- Employer: Boston College

Charles Derber is an American academic, author and political activist. He is a professor of sociology at Boston College. His work focuses on capitalism, globalization, corporate power and oligarchy, populism, authoritarianism and democracy, militarism, the climate crisis, cultural individualism, and social justice movements.

== Early life and education ==
Derber was born in Washington DC in January 1944, the son of University of Illinois Urbana-Champaign professor Milton Derber. Derber protested the Vietnam War and read the works of Karl Marx and Herbert Marcuse while in jail, according to an interview with Derber. He attended Yale University, where he graduated with a Bachelor of Arts degree in 1965 and was a member of Manuscript Society. He then studied at the University of Chicago where he earned a PhD in sociology.

== Career ==
Derber began teaching at Brandeis University in 1970 and switched to Boston College in 1980. He became a professor in 1991 and has taught in the undergraduate and graduate programs.

=== Writings and views ===
==== Early works: attention, narcissism, and wilding ====
In 1980, he published a book entitled The Pursuit of Attention that focuses on ego-centeredness and "conversational narcissism" in everyday life, which he shows are structured by class, gender, and America's individualistic culture. H. Wayne Hogan wrote that the book "...adds nothing to the existing stock of knowledge on this subject." Mary F. Rogers, however, from the University of West Florida, wrote: "...this study is a refreshingly balanced, strongly grounded exploration of the routines Americans exploit in competing for attention. The author argues convincingly that those routines exhibit many features of market behavior."

In Beyond Wilding (1994), he used 1989 Central Park jogger case as a lens to examine "wilding," a term some perpetrators used to describe random acts of violence, as a larger metaphor for pervasive anti-social behavior in American society. He went on to publish The Wilding of America: Money, Mayhem, and the New American Dream in 1996. Derber defines wilding as "self-oriented behavior that hurts others and damages the social fabric." Barbara Chasin wrote that the book analyzes "...the consequences of an unregulated American capitalist system." In 2013, Derber published his book Sociopathic Society. He writes that we are raising too many males to not have empathy. Relatedly, he has written that "Climate change is a symptom of the sociopathic character of our capitalist model."

==== Critiques of corporations and capitalism ====
Derber criticizes the expansive role and influences of corporations in society in his writing and commentary. In Corporation Nation: How Corporations Are Taking Over Our Lives and What We Can Do About It (1998), he argues that America has entered a new Gilded Age dominated by corporate oligopolies, likened to robber barons, that seize wealth, erode democracy, and shape every aspect of life, from work and consumption to politics, while relying on public subsidies yet prioritizing profits over societal well-being. Using a polemical style, he critiques trends like massive mergers, job displacement with contractors ("job genocide"), while synthesizing views from thinkers like William Greider and John Kenneth Galbraith.

Derber proposes "positive populism," a broad alliance to reform large corporations into "public" entities accountable to stakeholders (workers and society). He also wrote People Before Profit, which critiques corporate globalization and proposes alternatives. After the February 2018, Marjory Stoneman Douglas High School shooting, which killed 17, sparked teen survivors' #boycottNRA campaigns, leading over a dozen companies to sever ties with the National Rifle Association. Derber told USA Today that companies face little downside in severing NRA ties: "The corporations (breaking ties with the NRA) are not taking a large risk by engaging in this. They’re incurring greater risk if they don’t try to ally themselves with this strong population majority and the emotionally compelling voice of these young people." He emphasized corporations' superior leverage over states and municipalities by citing Amazon's HQ2 bidding war as proof of municipalities' dependence.

In 2026, Derber wrote his definitive work on populism, Fighting Oligarchy: How Positive Populism can Reclaim America. It offers both an analysis of Far-Right populism and the history and strategy of Left-leaning populism to overcome what Ralph Nader calls the "phony populism" of fascist movements and the Trump Administration.

==== Political regimes ====
Derber's Regime Change Begins at Home (2004) and Hidden Power (2005) analyze what he sees as the fusion of political and corporate power in the United States, framing it as a threat to democratic institutions. In Regime Change Begins at Home, Derber conceptualizes American history since the American Civil War as a succession of alternating regimes, defining "corporate regimes" as systems of rule that undermine democracy via "corpocracy," the marriage between big business and big government while prioritizing monopolies and profits over citizens and fair competition. He saw George W. Bush era marking the third such regime rooted in Gilded Age and Roaring Twenties precedents. Hidden Power scrutinizes presidential alliances with corporate interests as hidden mechanisms that threaten democracy.

His 2008 book Morality Wars analyzes hegemonic discourses from the Roman Empire to the present. It also examines religious and "born again" ideologies, from German fascism to contemporary evangelical politics in the United States. Another 2008 book, with Katherine Adam, The New Feminized Majority, examines the gendered character of values and politics in America. It argues that a new electoral majority has embraced progressive values historically associated with women, values now shared by millions of men.

==== Democracy, authoritarianism, and sociocide ====
In a 2024 Truthout interview, Derber and Yale R. Magrass discussed the "deep state" as an entrenched corporate-military-governmental alliance since the American Civil War that upholds class and caste hierarchies, undermining democracy. They note the military-industrial complex, through Pentagon ties to contractors like Lockheed Martin and Raytheon, as its core, enabling a permanent garrison state post-WWII that is rooted in America's dual capitalist and racial legacies that influenced authoritarian regimes, including Nazis. Tracing this through the Gilded Age, Jim Crow, and post-WWII "garrison state," they highlight bipartisan roles, growth of the military-industrial complex under Bill Clinton and Barack Obama, Republican deregulation under Ronald Reagan and racial appeals under Donald Trump which fueled neofascism and identity politics over class solidarity. They advocate "left populism," drawing from abolitionism, 1930s labor movements, and Occupy Wall Street, to foster interracial alliances and achieve "deep democracy." They argued that Democrats need a realignment.

His 2025 book, Bonfire: American Sociocide, Broken Relations and the Quest for Democracy, argues that market-driven competition and greed are breaking down social relations and community, leading to American sociocide, an epidemic of loneliness, and a breeding ground of authoritarianism.

In 2026, Derber published his most important work on authoritarianism called Wired for Authoritarianism: American Oligarchies and How to Rewire America for the People. It shows that Trump did not invent American authoritarianism; he inherited it. Derber shows that the Constitution is not a democratic document and explains how Americans have drunk the kool-aid about the history of American as the world's exceptionalist democracy. He shows that the US developed as a "covert authoritarian" system under two generations of corporate oligarchs and that Trump ushered in a third corporate regime in which American covert authoritarianism has become "overt authoritarianism." Kurt Jacobson, a political scientist and reviewer from the University of Chicago, calls the book "an alarm and analysis" in the "best Tom Paine tradition."

== Books published ==
- Derber, Charles; Schwartz, William A; Magrass, Yale (1990). Power in the Highest Degree: Professionals and the Rise of a New Mandarin Order. New York: University of Oxford Press. ISBN 9781601295927.
- Schwartz, William A; Derber, Charles (1990). The Nuclear Seduction: Why the Arms Race Doesn't Matter—and What Does (Paper). Berkeley: University of California Press. ISBN 9780520061347.
- Derber, Charles (1996). The Wilding of America: How Greed and Violence Are Eroding Our Nation's Character (Paper). New York: St. Martin's Press. ISBN 9780312132903.
- ———— (1998). Corporation Nation: How Corporations Are Taking Over Our Lives and What We Can Do About It (1st ed.). New York: St. Martin's Press. ISBN 9780312192884.
- ———— (2000a). The Pursuit of Attention; Power and Ego in Everyday Life (Paper) (2nd ed.). London: Oxford University Press. ISBN 9780195135497.
- ———— (2002). People before Profit: The New Globalization in the Age of Terror, Big Money, and Economic Crisis (1st ed.). New York: St. Martin's Press. ISBN 9780312306694.
- ———— (2004). Regime Change Begins at Home: Freeing America from Corporate Rule (Digital) (1st ed.). San Francisco: Berrett-Koehler Publishers. ISBN 9781605092942.
- ———— (2005). Hidden Power: What You Need to Know to Save Our Democracy (Paper). San Francisco: Berrett-Koehler Publishers. ISBN 9781576753453.
- Derber, Charles; Magrass, Yale R (2008). Morality Wars: How Empires, the Born Again, and the Politically Correct Do Evil in the Name of Good (Hardcover). Boulder: Paradigm Publishers. ISBN 9781594515125.
- Derber, Charles (2010). Greed to Green: Solving Climate Change and Remaking the Economy (Hardcover). Boulder: Paradigm Publishers. ISBN 9781594518119.
- ———— (2011). Marx's Ghost: Midnight Conversations on Changing the World (Hardcover). Paradigm Publishers. ISBN 9781612050652.
- Derber, Charles; Magrass, Yale R (2012). Surplus American: How the 1% is Making Us Redundant (Hardcover). Boulder: Paradigm Publishers. ISBN 9781612052496.
- ———— (2013). Sociopathic Society: A People's Sociology of the United States (Hardcover). Boulder: Paradigm Publishers. ISBN 9781612054377.
- ———— (2014). Capitalism: Should You Buy It?. Routledge. ISBN 9781612056890.
- ———— (2015). The Disinherited Majority: Capital Questions—Piketty and Beyond (Hardcover). Boulder: Paradigm Publishers. ISBN 9781612058313.
- ———— (2016). Bully Nation: How the American Establishment Creates a Bullying Society. University Press of Kansas. ISBN 9780700622603.
- ———— (2017). Welcome to the Revolution: Universalizing Resistance for Social Justice and Democracy in Perilous Times. Routledge. ISBN 9781138648203.
- Derber, Charles; Magrass, Yale R (2018). Moving Beyond Fear: Upending the Security Tales in Capitalism, Fascism, and Democracy (Universalizing Resistance series) (1st ed.). Routledge. ISBN 978-1138656673.
- Magrass, Yale R; Derber, Charles (2019). Glorious Causes; The Irrationality of Capitalism, War and Politics (Hardcover). Routledge. ISBN 9780367263195.
- Derber, Charles; Moodliar, Suren (2023). Dying For Capitalism: How Big Money Fuels Our Extinction and What We Can Do About It. New York: Routledge.
- Derber, Charles; Magrass, Yale (2024). Who Owns Democracy? The Real Deep State and the Struggle Over Class and Caste in America. NY: Routledge.
- Derber, Charles (2025). Bonfire: American Sociocide, Broken Relations, and the Quest for Democracy. Routledge.
- ———— (2026). Wired for authoritarianism: American oligarchies and how to re-wire America for the people. Universalizing resistance. London: Routledge. doi:10.4324/9781003751335. ISBN 978-1-040-87261-1.
- ———— (2026a). Fighting Oligarchy: How Positive Populism Can Reclaim America. Routledge.
