= Peter McGuffin =

British psychiatrist and geneticist (1949–2024)

Peter McGuffin CBE FMedSci
- Born: 4 February 1949
- Died: 30 January 2024 (aged 74)
- Citizenship: United Kingdom
- Education: University of Leeds; University of London; Washington University in St. Louis
- Spouse: Anne Farmer
- Awards: Ming Tsuang Lifetime Award (2007)
- Scientific career
- Fields: Psychiatric genetics
- Workplaces: Institute of Psychiatry; University of Wales, Cardiff

Peter McGuffin CBE FMedSci (04 February 1949 – 30 January 2024) was a Northern Irish psychiatrist and geneticist from Belfast.

== Early life ==
Peter McGuffin was born in Belfast, Northern Ireland on 4 February 1949. He was the eldest of three children of Martha Melba (née Burnison) and William Brown McGuffin, a merchant navy officer and Royal Naval reservist. The family moved to the Isle of Wight in 1959 when William was appointed a Trinity House Pilot for the Port of Southampton.

== Education and career summary ==
McGuffin entered Isle of Wight's Sandown Grammar School at age 10. At age 15 he made an early career choice, deciding to become a psychiatrist after coming across Freud's Introductory Lectures on Psychoanalysis in the local public library at Ryde. He attended medical school at the University of Leeds, where he graduated in 1972 and then received postgraduate training in internal medicine. At this stage, he became interested in genetics and had his first publications on immunogenetic aspects of coronary heart disease.

While he and his wife Anne Farmer were still junior doctors in Leeds, he transitioned this interest to psychiatric disorders and carried out one of the first genetic marker association studies on schizophrenia. This research suggested an association between the HLA system and the disorder, which was subsequently confirmed 36 years later by a genome-wide association study, led by one of McGuffin's former PhD students Michael C. O'Donovan.

McGuffin completed his training as a psychiatrist at the Maudsley Hospital, London and was awarded a Medical Research Council Fellowship to study genetics at the University of London and at Washington University in St. Louis, where he spent a formative 18 months under the mentorship of 'Ted' Theodore Reich and Irving Gottesman. He completed a PhD with a thesis describing one of the first multi-marker genetic linkage studies in schizophrenia. He then became an MRC Senior Clinical Fellow at the Maudsley and the Institute of Psychiatry (now part of King's College London) and then took up the Chair of Psychological Medicine at the University of Wales College of Medicine in Cardiff in 1987. He subsequently established the Cardiff department as one of the World's leading centres for psychiatric genetic research, and was among the early pioneers of multi-centre international collaborations in psychiatric genetics such as the European Science Foundation programme on the Molecular Neurobiology of Mental Illness (MNMI).

He moved back to London as successor to Prof Sir Michael Rutter as Director of the MRC Social, Genetic and Developmental Psychiatry Centre at the Institute of Psychiatry in October 1998. From January 2007 to December 2009, he was the Dean of the Institute of Psychiatry. He was elected a founder Fellow of the Academy of Medical Sciences in 1998. Despite his very early Freudian leanings, McGuffin's research and publications have mainly focused on the genetics of normal and abnormal behaviour.

== Contributions to research ==
=== Linkage and association ===
As a junior doctor Peter McGuffin carried out one of the earliest allelic association studies in psychiatry. This implicated the major histocompatibility complex (MHC) in schizophrenia. He subsequently performed a meta-analysis of his and four other studies of HLA-schizophrenia association showing highly significant results. The MHC association was eventually confirmed by genome wide association studies (GWAS) more than 30 years later. He went on to perform the first family linkage study of schizophrenia that used multiple classical markers and applied plausible parametric models as well as non-parametric analysis. This formed the basis of his PhD in which he also performed power analyses demonstrating that very much larger sample sizes would be necessary to identify responsible loci in disorders such as schizophrenia using linkage because of incomplete penetrance. To this end McGuffin, with his colleague Roger Marchbanks, wrote a proposal to the European Science Foundation (ESF) that led to the multi centre network, then programme, on MNMI. The MNMI ran from 1987–96 and brought together 14 ESF member organisations including the MRC. It kickstarted molecular psychiatric genetics in Europe and inspired the setting up of a parallel multicentre collaboration in the US under NIMH.

A solution to the problem of establishing diagnostic standardisation and reliability across the European and US collaborations was provided by the computerised OPCRIT system. OPCRIT showed good reliability across European and US sites and has continued to be used frequently in genetic and epidemiological studies including the bipolar disorder (BPD) component of the landmark 2007 Wellcome Trust Case Control Consortium.

Long before it was technically achievable, McGuffin was an advocate of aiming to scan the entire genome for genes involved in the common disorders such as schizophrenia, BPD and major depressive disorder (MDD), bearing in mind that they likely involved several, perhaps many, genes. This was also likely to be the case for quantitative behavioural traits such as cognitive ability. The principles were set out in an influential review with Plomin and Owen which pointed out that linkage was appropriate for detection of quantitative trait loci (QTLs) or polygenes contributing comparatively large amounts of variance (~10%) whereas association can detect small effects (1% or less). At this stage genome wide linkage was becoming feasible but GWAS was still a dream. The alternative association approach was a focus on candidate genes that encode for proteins with a plausible aetiological role. An example was the 5-HT2a receptor gene found to be schizophrenia associated by EMASS (EU funded, PI McGuffin), the first multicentre candidate gene association study of its type. McGuffin subsequently led genome wide searches including the GSK funded Depression Network (DeNt) sib pair linkage study across 7 European and US sites and the MRC-funded first GWAS of MDD. As with other disorders, these initial genome wide searches pointed to the need for vastly larger sample sizes, and so McGuffin’s group pooled resources with others forming the Psychiatric Genomics Consortium which has gone onto to identify multiple genome wide significant ‘hits’ in BPD, MDD as well as in schizophrenia, autism and ADHD. By sharing genome wide data McGuffin’s group have also participated in successful searches in other disorders including motor neuron disease and eye disease.

=== Gene-Environment (GE) Interplay ===
In 1982 McGuffin became the first psychiatrist to be awarded an MRC senior clinical fellowship. This was to carry out a novel family study of index cases with or without serious adversity in the form of threatening life events before the onset of MDD and their relatives. Contrary to the widely held clinical view at that time that depression could be divided into reactive and endogenous forms, there was no difference in the frequency of depression in relatives whether or not the index cases had an illness precipitated by adversity. Nor was there any correspondence between clinical symptom pattern and familiality. Furthermore, the frequency of reported life events among relatives of index cases was markedly higher than that in the general population raising the issue that both adversity and depression were familial. These findings were viewed as controversial at the time challenging the idea that it was possible to separate threatening events that arise “out of the blue” from those that are dependent on an individual’s behaviour. McGuffin followed up the Camberwell findings in a study in Cardiff that compared subjects with and without onset depression and their nearest age siblings. In a series of publications McGuffin and Farmer tested the alternative hypotheses that the familial overlap between depression and life events reflected either a hazard prone lifestyle or a tendency to over perceive adversity or simply a tendency for adverse events to be shared by relatives. The findings suggested that all three types of explanation played a part and the lifestyle or cognitive components were significantly influenced by personality factors. This was in keeping with work by McGuffin and Thapar that self reported life events in adolescents have a heritable component whereas parent reported events in the same subjects do not. The genetic contribution to self reported events was subsequently confirmed by Robert Power, one of McGuffin’s PhD students, by estimating GWAS-derived SNP heritability.

On a related theme, one of the most controversial areas in 21st century behavioural genetics has concerned attempts to explore GE interactions with specific brain expressed genes, much of the original work coming from other groups in the McGuffin led MRC SGDP Centre. Uher and McGuffin have scrutinized the world data for a functional polymorphism in the promoter of the serotonin transporter gene and concluded that there is true effect, with positive replication depending on use of hard, objective environmental measurements. This is in keeping with McGuffin’s earlier findings that more subjective reports of adversity are influenced by personality/heritable factors.

=== Twin studies ===
McGuffin and colleagues re-examined the classic Maudsley schizophrenia study of Gottesman and Shields at a time when there widespread questioning of a genetic component for schizophrenia on the basis that studies until then had used descriptive clinical diagnoses rather than modern operational criteria. It was found that, far from reducing genetic evidence, the application of explicit and reliable modern criteria indicated high heritability. Subsequently the recently introduced DSM III criteria were scrutinized and found to be valid in that, when applied strictly and excluding broader phenotypes, they defined a highly heritable syndrome. Further studies using an extended Maudsley twin register series estimated heritability of related psychotic syndromes using structural equation models (SEM) and also showed that the genetic components of schizophrenia and BPD overlap as well as having specific components distinct to each syndrome. This was thought highly controversial at the time but has now been borne out by other studies including GWAS. Turning to mood disorders it was shown with SEM that both clinically ascertained and operationally defined MDD and BPD are substantially heritable with both overlapping and syndrome-specific components. Again, this has now been confirmed by GWAS.

Until the 1990s genetic data on childhood psychiatric disorders were scant. With his then MRC fellow Anita Thapar, McGuffin launched a systematically ascertained Cardiff twin register. Among their early findings were that depressive symptomatology before adult life is influenced by genetic factors. More specifically, genetic effects were especially important in adolescence, whereas shared environmental effects account for most of the variation among children in the 8-11 age group, a pattern that has subsequently been replicated elsewhere. They were also among the first to establish the heritability of ADHD, and that severe ADHD with conduct problems is especially heritable.

=== Pharmacogenomics ===
The EU funded GENDEP study is a multi-site investigation that used animal, in vitro and human studies to investigate predictors of antidepressant response. The first of its kind, the partly randomized human study of two drugs with differing modes of action (serotinergic and noradrenergic) produced suggestive GWAS results and highly significant findings with an inflammatory marker (high sensitivity CRP) that appears to be state dependent. The GENDEP study, along with other GWAS related studies, has generated vast amounts of clinical and ‘omics’ data. With psychiatry now entering a big data era, McGuffin and colleagues developed machine learning and AI related approaches as a practical solution to big data analysis.

== Personal life and death ==
McGuffin met Anne Farmer at medical school in Leeds and they married on graduation in 1972. She subsequently became an academic psychiatrist and they published many papers together. They had three children.

Peter McGuffin died on 30 January 2024, at the age of 74.

== Awards ==
McGuffin was elected Fellow of the Royal College of Physicians of London in 1988 and Fellow of the Royal College of Psychiatrists in 1989 and became a founder Fellow of the Academy of Medical Sciences in 1998. Other honours include Lifetime Achievement Awards from the International Society for Psychiatric Genetics (2007) and King's College London (2012) and an Honorary Fellowship from Cardiff University (2008). He was appointed Commander of the Order of the British Empire (CBE) in the 2016 Birthday Honours for services to biomedical research and psychiatric genetics. He served as the second president of the International Society of Psychiatric Genetics (1996-2000) .

== Publications ==
McGuffin published more than 500 papers and is one of the 3000 or so researchers who, according to Google Scholar, has an H index of more than 100.

- Behavioral Genetics in the Postgenomic Era, by Robert Plomin, John C. DeFries, Ian W. Craig, and Peter McGuffin
- Behavioral Genetics by John C. DeFries, Peter McGuffin, Gerald E. McClearn, and Robert Plomin
- Beyond Nature and Nurture in Psychiatry, by James MacCabe, Owen O'Daly, Robin Murray, and Peter McGuffin
- Psychiatric Genetics and Genomics, by Peter McGuffin, Michael J. Owen, and Irving I. Gottesman
- Measuring Psychopathology, by Anne Farmer, Peter McGuffin, and Julie Williams
- The New Genetics of Mental Illness, by Peter McGuffin and Robin Murray
- Schizophrenia: The Major Issues, by Paul Bebbington and Peter McGuffin
- The Essentials of Psychiatry, by Robin Murray, Ken Kendler, Peter McGuffin, and Simon Wessely
