= Arpana Agrawal =

Psychiatric geneticist

- Education: Virginia Commonwealth University
- Awards: Theodore Reich Young Investigator Award from the International Society of Psychiatric Genetics (2018)
- Scientific career
- Fields: Psychiatric genetics
- Institutions: Washington University School of Medicine
- Thesis: Illicit drug use, abuse and dependence: A genetic study using twin data (2004)
- Doctoral advisor: Kenneth Kendler

Arpana Agrawal is a psychiatric geneticist and professor of psychiatry at Washington University School of Medicine, known for researching the roles of genetic and environmental factors in cannabis use and addiction. She also serves as co-chair of the Psychiatric Genomics Consortium working group on Substance Use Disorders. In 2018, she received the Theodore Reich Young Investigator Award from the International Society of Psychiatric Genetics. She also received the Fuller/Scott Award from the Behavioral Genetics Association in 2010 and the Henri Begleiter Excellence in Research Award from the Research Society on Alcohol in 2022.
