= International Society of Psychiatric Genetics =

The International Society of Psychiatric Genetics (ISPG) is a learned society that aims to "promote and facilitate research in the genetics of psychiatric disorders, substance use disorders and allied traits". To this end, among other things, it organizes an annual "World Congress of Psychiatric Genetics".

It also awards each year the "Ming Tsuang Lifetime Achievement Award" for scientists who have made major contributions to the field of psychiatric genetics and the "Theodore Reich Young Investigator Award" for work of exceptional merit by researchers under 40 years of age.

== Presidents ==
The following people have been president of the society:

- 1992–1996: Theodore Reich
- 1996–2000: Peter McGuffin
- 2000–2005: Mike Owen
- 2005–2010: Ming Tsuang
- 2010–2012: Nick Craddock
- 2012–2016: Francis J. McMahon
- 2016–present: Thomas G. Schulze

== Ming Tsuang Lifetime Achievement Award ==
The annual Ming Tsuang Lifetime Achievement Award is given to a distinguished senior scientist who has made significant and sustained contributions to the advancement of the field of psychiatric genetics. It is named for Ming Tsuang, who was the recipient of the award in 1995. The following persons have received this award:

- 1993: Seymour S. Kety and George Winokur
- 1995: Ming T. Tsuang
- 1997: Irving I. Gottesman
- 1999: Theodore Reich
- 2001: Michael Conneally
- 2002: Jules Angst and Niki Erlenmeyer-Kimling
- 2003: C.Robert Cloninger
- 2004: Peter Propping
- 2005: Not awarded
- 2006: Elliot S. Gershon
- 2007: Peter McGuffin
- 2008: Jürg Ott
- 2010: Susan E. Folstein
- 2011: Kenneth Kendler
- 2012: Raymond Crowe
- 2013: John Nurnberger
- 2014: Margaret Pericak-Vance
- 2015: Michael Owen
- 2016: J. Raymond DePaulo, Jr.
- 2017: Pamela Sklar and Marcella Rietschel
- 2018: Stephen Faraone
- 2019: Patrick Sullivan
- 2020: Lynn DeLisi and Michael O'Donovan
- 2021: Naomi Wray
