= Alexander Niculescu =

American psychiatrist

Alexander B. Niculescu, III
- Known for: Genes and Biomarkers (medicine); Personalized medicine
- Scientific career
- Fields: Psychiatric genetics and genomics Psychopharmacology
- Workplaces: Indiana University School of Medicine; Indianapolis VA Medical Center

Alexander Bogdan ("Bob") Niculescu, III is a Romanian born, San Diego, California, educated and trained (The Scripps Research Institute, UCSD School of Medicine) scientist and physician. He is a Professor in the Department of Psychiatry at the Indiana University School of Medicine in Indianapolis, Indiana, Director of the Laboratory of Neurophenomics, and an Attending Psychiatrist and R&D Investigator at the Indianapolis VA Medical Center. Considered the inventor of Convergent Functional Genomics (CFG), he is a prominent figure in the field of personalized medicine in psychiatry. His early contributions to the psychiatric genetics field include identification of candidate genes, pathways and mechanisms for bipolar disorder using convergent (human and animal model, genetic and gene expression) studies In particular, his work and that of his collaborators has focused attention on circadian clock genes as core components of mood regulation Since these contributions, his research program has expanded to include similar work on schizophrenia alcoholism and stress disorders leading to the identification of panels of DNA and RNA markers for disease risk prediction and severity of illness. Niculescu pioneered early on the view that psychiatric disorders are genetically complex, heterogeneous, and overlapping, requiring gene level integration of data followed by pathway analyses. The cumulative combinatorics of common variants and environment model he described for bipolar and other complex disorders based on empirical data, is being increasingly supported by evidence from other groups working on psychiatric and non-psychiatric disorders. More recently, he has proposed a comprehensive unifying model (Mindscape) for conceptualizing how the mind works. His most recent work has focused on understanding and developing genomic and clinical risk predictors for suicide, a preventable tragedy and increasing public health problem.

Niculescu is a past NARSAD awards (2002, 2005) recipient and Pfizer Fellow. In 2004, he received the American Psychiatric Association/ AstraZeneca Young Minds in Psychiatry Award, and in 2007, the Theodore Reich Award from the International Society of Psychiatric Genetics. In 2010, Dr. Niculescu received a prestigious NIH Director's New Innovator Award, and in 2012 a Trailblazer Award from Indiana University.
