= Caroline Bell (academic) =

New Zealand psychiatrist

Academic background
- Thesis: Investigation of the role of serotonin in anxiety and panic disorder (2003)

Caroline Jane Bell is a New Zealand psychiatry academic, and is a full professor at the University of Otago, specialising in investigating the psychological impacts of trauma. She led the Canterbury District Health Board's response to mental health after the Christchurch earthquakes and led a collaboration on the effects of the Christchurch mosque shootings.

== Academic career ==
Bell completed a medical degree at the University of Oxford, a Master of Arts degree at the University of Cambridge, followed by a PhD at the University of Bristol titled Investigation of the role of serotonin in anxiety and panic disorder. Bell then joined the faculty of the Department of Psychological Medicine at the University of Otago in Christchurch, rising to associate professor in 2014 and full professor in 2024.

Bell's research focuses on the psychological impacts of trauma, and is interested in the different outcomes that result for people after trauma, including distress and resilience, and how outcomes are influenced by factors such as people's culture, spiritual practices and religion. She has studied the effects of the Canterbury earthquakes, the Christchurch mosque attacks of 2019, and the COVID-19 lockdowns. Her research found that the lockdown experience was worse for people with pre-existing mental illness. Bell led the Canterbury District Health Board's response to mental health after the Christchurch earthquakes, and alongside Dr Ruqayya Sulaiman-Hill, she led a large Health Research Council-funded research collaboration between the Universities of Canterbury and Otago, and the Canterbury District Health Board, to investigate the physical and psychological effects of the mosque attacks, and to link survivors with support services. Bell has also investigated group transdiagnostic treatment as a potential more effective treatment for anxiety and depression.

== Selected works ==
- Cecilia Bourke; Porter, Richard J.; Carter, Janet Deborah; McIntosh, Virginia Violet Williams; Jordan, Jennifer; Bell, Caroline Jane; Carter, Frances; Colhoun, Helen; Joyce, Peter Richard (2012). "Comparison of neuropsychological functioning and emotional processing in major depression and social anxiety disorder subjects, and matched healthy controls". Australian and New Zealand Journal of Psychiatry. 46 (10): 972–981. doi:10.1177/0004867412451502. PMID 22711880. Wikidata Q48659426.
- Bell, Caroline Jane; Colhoun, Helen; Frampton, Christopher; Douglas, Katie; McIntosh, Virginia Violet Williams; Carter, Frances; Jordan, Jennifer; Carter, Janet Deborah; Rebekah A Smith; Leila M A Marie; Alex Loughlin; Richard J Porter (2017). "Earthquake Brain: Altered Recognition and Misclassification of Facial Expressions Are Related to Trauma Exposure but Not Posttraumatic Stress Disorder". Frontiers in Psychiatry. 8: 278. doi:10.3389/fpsyt.2017.00278. PMC 5732911. PMID 29312012. Wikidata Q47274863.
- Bell, Caroline Jane; Shamina Bhikha; Colhoun, Helen; Carter, Frances; Frampton, Christopher; Porter, Richard J. (2013). "The response to sulpiride in social anxiety disorder: D2 receptor function". Journal of Psychopharmacology. 27 (2): 146–51. doi:10.1177/0269881112450778. PMID 22745189. Wikidata Q28269795.
- Ruqayya C Sulaiman-Hill; Porter, Richard J.; Sandila Tanveer; Boden, Joseph M.; Beaglehole, Ben; Schluter, Philip John; Shaystah Dean; Bell, Caroline Jane (2021). "Psychosocial impacts on the Christchurch Muslim community following the 15 March terrorist attacks: a mixed-methods study protocol". BMJ Open. 11 (10) e055413. doi:10.1136/bmjopen-2021-055413. PMC 8488282. PMID 34598996. Wikidata Q125165005.
- Ruqayya Sulaiman-Hill; Porter, Richard J.; Schluter, Philip John; Beaglehole, Ben; Shaystah Dean; Sandila Tanveer; Boden, Joseph M.; Bell, Caroline Jane (2024). "Research following trauma in minority ethnic and faith communities: lessons from a study of the psychosocial sequelae of the Christchurch mosque terror attacks". BJPsych open. 10 (1): e27. doi:10.1192/bjo.2023.641. PMC 10790214. PMID 38205604. Wikidata Q125164995.
