= Virginia McIntosh =

New Zealand clinical psychologist

Academic background
- Education: University of Otago, University of Canterbury
- Thesis: Psychotherapy for anorexia nervosa: a randomised controlled trial (2003)

Virginia Violet Williams McIntosh is a New Zealand clinical psychologist, and is a full professor at the University of Canterbury, specialising in improving therapy outcomes for disorders such as anorexia nervosa, bulimia nervosa, depression and anxiety.

== Academic career ==
McIntosh did her undergraduate degree at the University of Canterbury, before completing a PhD titled Psychotherapy for anorexia nervosa: a randomised controlled trial at the University of Otago. After working as part of a clinical research team studying serious mental disorders, MacIntosh joined the faculty of the University of Canterbury in 2017, rising to full professor in the School of Psychology, Speech and Hearing in 2022.

McIntosh's research focuses on assessing and improving the outcomes of therapies for psychological disorders, such as eating disorders, depression and anxiety. McIntosh led research that trialled three types of treatment for bulimia, comparing the success rates of the current best treatment, cognitive behavioural therapy (CBT), against CBT combined with exposure therapy, or with relaxation therapy. They found that around half the exposure therapy group were no longer binging and purging five years after treatment, compared to approximately a quarter of the other patients. McIntosh has also led research on how Christchurch residents coped with the Christchurch earthquakes, and how to stay well in times of stress and uncertainty. McIntosh trains health professionals in cognitive behaviour therapy.

As of 2024, McIntosh is a board member of the Aotearoa New Zealand Association for Cognitive Behavioural Therapies.

== Selected works ==
- McIntosh, Virginia Violet Williams; Jordan, Jennifer; Carter, Frances; Luty, Suzanne; McKenzie, Janice M.; Bulik, Cynthia M.; Frampton, Christopher; Joyce, Peter Richard (2005). "Three psychotherapies for anorexia nervosa: a randomized, controlled trial". The American Journal of Psychiatry. 162 (4): 741–747. doi:10.1176/appi.ajp.162.4.741. PMID 15800147. Wikidata Q44909564.
- Carter, Frances; Jordan, Jennifer; McIntosh, Virginia Violet Williams; Luty, Suzanne; McKenzie, Janice M.; Frampton, Christopher; Bulik, Cynthia M.; Joyce, Peter Richard (2010). "The long-term efficacy of three psychotherapies for anorexia nervosa: a randomized, controlled trial". International Journal of Eating Disorders. 44 (7): 647–654. doi:10.1002/eat.20879. PMID 21997429. Wikidata Q85092282.
- Carter, Janet Deborah; McIntosh, Virginia Violet Williams; Jordan, Jennifer; Porter, Richard J.; Frampton, Christopher; Joyce, Peter Richard (2013). "Psychotherapy for depression: a randomized clinical trial comparing schema therapy and cognitive behavior therapy". Journal of Affective Disorders. 151 (2): 500–505. doi:10.1016/j.jad.2013.06.034. PMID 23870427. Wikidata Q44200520.
- Schmidt, Ulrike; Anna Oldershaw; Fatima Jichi; Lot Sternheim; Helen Startup; McIntosh, Virginia Violet Williams; Jordan, Jennifer; Chanturia, Ketevan; Geoffrey Wolff; Michael Rooney; Sabine Landau; Janet Treasure (2012). "Out-patient psychological therapies for adults with anorexia nervosa: randomised controlled trial". British Journal of Psychiatry. 201 (5): 392–399. doi:10.1192/bjp.bp.112.112078. PMID 22995632. Wikidata Q48608351.
- C. M. Bulik; P. F. Sullivan; P. R. Joyce; F. A. Carter; V. V. McIntosh (1998). "Predictors of 1-year treatment outcome in bulimia nervosa". Comprehensive Psychiatry. 39 (4): 206–214. doi:10.1016/s0010-440x(98)90062-1. PMID 9675505. Wikidata Q45112700.
- Virginia McIntosh, Wikidata Q97072463
- S Byrne; T Wade; P Hay; et al. (2017). "A randomised controlled trial of three psychological treatments for anorexia nervosa". Psychological Medicine. 47 (16): 2823–2833. doi:10.1017/s0033291717001349. PMID 28552083. Wikidata Q47874187.
