= Todd Lencz =

American psychologist and academic

- Born: Todd Evan Lencz
- Education: Yale University (BA in psychology); University of Southern California (MA and PhD in clinical psychology)
- Awards: Young Investigator's Award from the National Alliance for Research on Schizophrenia and Depression (2001); Robins/Guze Award from the American Psychopathological Association (2007); EUREKA Award from the National Institutes of Health (2008)
- Scientific career
- Fields: Human genetics; Psychiatric genetics
- Workplaces: Zucker School of Medicine; Feinstein Institute for Medical Research
- Thesis: Psychophysiological and behavioral antecedents of schizophrenia-spectrum personality disorder (1995)

Todd Lencz is an American psychologist and academic whose research is mainly in the field of psychiatric genetics.

== Work ==
He is a professor in the Institute of Behavioral Science at the Feinstein Institute for Medical Research, as well as a professor of Psychiatry and Molecular Medicine at the Donald and Barbara Zucker School of Medicine at Hofstra/Northwell. He also leads the Laboratory of Neurogenomic Biomarkers within the Center for Psychiatric Neuroscience at the Feinstein Institutes for Medical Research. He is the leader of the Cognitive Genomics consorTium (COGENT), the founder and co-leader of the Ashkenazi Genome Consortium, and a member of both the Psychiatric Genomics Consortium and the Enhancing Neuroimaging Genetics through Meta-analysis (ENIGMA) consortium. In 2020, he was elected a fellow of the American College of Neuropsychopharmacology.

== Selected publications ==
- Lencz T, Sabatello M*, Docherty A*, Peterson RE*, Soda T*, Austin J, Bierut L, Crepaz-Keay D, Curtis D, Degenhardt F, Huckins L, Lázaro-Muñoz G, Mattheisen M, Meiser B, Peay H, Rietschel M, Walss-Bass C, Davis LK. (2022) Concerns about the use of preimplantation embryo screening for psychiatric and cognitive traits using polygenic risk scores. Lancet Psychiatry, 9(10): 838-844.
- Lencz T, Moyett A, Argyelan M, Barber AD, Cholewa J, Birnbaum ML, Gallego JA, John M, Szeszko PR, Robinson DG, Malhotra AK. (2022) Frontal lobe fALFF measured from resting-state fMRI as a prognostic biomarker in first episode psychosis. Neuropsychopharmacology, 47(13):2245-2251.
- Lencz T*, Backenroth D*, Granot-Hershkovitz E, Green A, Gettler K, Cho JH, Weissbrod O, Zuk O, Carmi S. (2021) Utility of polygenic embryo screening for disease depends on the selection strategy. eLife,10:e64716.
- Lencz T, Yu J, Khan RR, Flaherty E, Carmi S, Lam M, Ben-Avraham D, Barzilai N, Bressman S, Darvasi A, Cho JH, Clark LN, Gümüş ZH, Joseph V, Klein R, Lipkin S, Offit K, Ostrer H, Ozelius LJ, Peter I, Malhotra AK, Maniatis T, Atzmon G, Pe’er I. (2021) Novel ultra-rare exonic variants identified in a founder population implicate cadherins in schizophrenia. Neuron,109(9):1465-1478.
