= Francis J. McMahon =

American psychiatric geneticist

- Education: University of Pennsylvania; Johns Hopkins University School of Medicine
- Awards: Colvin Mood Disorders Prize from the Brain & Behavior Research Foundation (2016)
- Scientific career
- Fields: Psychiatric genetics
- Institutions: University of Chicago; National Institute of Mental Health; Johns Hopkins University School of Medicine

Francis J. McMahon is an American psychiatric geneticist and Chief of the Human Genetics Branch at the National Institute of Mental Health. He is also a visiting professor of psychiatry at the Johns Hopkins University School of Medicine.

He served as president of the International Society of Psychiatric Genetics from 2012 to 2016.

McMahon received a BA in Biology from the University of Pennsylvania in 1982 and an MD from Johns Hopkins University in 1987.

From 1998 to 2002 McMahon was an associate professor at the University of Chicago.

In 2002 he joined the NIMH Intramural Research Program as Chief of the genetics unit in the Mood and Anxiety Disorders Program. He became Senior Investigator and Chief of the Human Genetics Branch in 2010.

He is a fellow of the American College of Neuropsychopharmacology, and he received the Colvin Mood Disorders Prize from the Brain & Behavior Research Foundation in 2016.

McMahon's research focuses on the genetic basis of mood and anxiety disorders, as well as the role of genetics in both positive and negative responses to antidepressant drugs.
