= American Journal of Medical Genetics =

- Discipline: Human genetics
- Language: English
- Edited by: A: Maximilian Muenke, B: Ming T. Tsuang, Stephen Faraone, C: John C. Carey

Publication details
- History: 1977–present
- Publisher: Wiley-Blackwell (United States)
- Frequency: 24/year

Standard abbreviations
- ISO 4: Am. J. Med. Genet.

Indexing
- Part A
- CODEN: AJMGB8
- ISSN: 1552-4833 (print); 1552-4825 (web)
- Part B
- CODEN: AJMGC9
- ISSN: 1552-4841 (print); 1552-485X (web)
- Part C
- CODEN: AJMGFC
- ISSN: 1552-4868 (print); 1552-4876 (web)

American Journal of Medical Genetics is a peer-reviewed medical journal dealing with human genetics published in three separate sections (parts) by Wiley-Liss:

- American Journal of Medical Genetics Part A
- American Journal of Medical Genetics Part B: Neuropsychiatric Genetics
- American Journal of Medical Genetics Part C: Seminars in Medical Genetics

Until 1996 they were one journal under the name American Journal of Medical Genetics, when they split into Part A and Part B. Part C was established in 1999.

Part A of the journal focuses on specific domains within the discipline of medical genetics. Specifically, it is focused on the study of the cause and pathogenesis (including molecular analyses); delineation (including phenotype analyses, natural history, variability, nosology, and newly recognized syndromes); and management (including genetic counseling, care guidelines, and treatment) of human congenital anomalies and genetic disorders. While recognizing the existence of thousands of human genetic conditions, the journal focuses on phenotypically driven analyses of disorders of morphogenesis, metabolism, and neurogenetics, especially intellectual disability and related neurodevelopmental conditions. Other principal themes of the journal include the epidemiology of congenital malformations, behavioral phenotypes of syndromes, and astute clinical observations. (adapted from the AJMG part A website)

The founding editor in chief of the journal was John M. Opitz, the second editor in chief was John C. Carey, and the current editor in chief (Part A) is Maximilian Muenke. Carey continues as editor in chief of Part C.
