= Stephen Faraone =

American psychologist

Stephen V. Faraone
- Born: July 27, 1956 (age 70); Babylon, New York, USA
- Education: State University of New York at Stony Brook (B.A.); University of Iowa (Ph.D.); Brown University (Internship & Post Doctoral Programs)
- Known for: Research into the nature, causes and treatment of ADHD
- Awards: CHADD Hall of Fame, Chancellor's Award for Excellence in Scholarship and Creative Activities from the State University of New York, Alumni Fellow status at the University of Iowa, Lifetime Achievement Award from the International Society of Psychiatric Genetics, Lifetime Achievement Award from the American Professional Society of ADHD and Related Disorders.
- Scientific career
- Fields: Child psychology and psychiatry
- Workplaces: Harvard Medical School Massachusetts General Hospital Norton College of Medicine, State University of New York Upstate Medical University
- Doctoral advisor: Richard Hurtig, Ph.D.

Stephen Vincent Faraone (born July 27, 1956) is an American psychologist who is a distinguished professor of psychiatry, physiology and neuroscience at SUNY Upstate Medical University and president of the World Federation of ADHD. Involved in research since 1978, he is an expert on attention-deficit hyperactivity disorder (ADHD) and related disorders and was ranked as the 80th "best scientist in the world" and 57th best in the United States by Research.com.

== Education and career ==
Faraone graduated in 1978 from the State University of New York at Stony Brook with a BA in Psychology. He then went to the University of Iowa where he obtained his Master of Arts and Doctor of Philosophy. Faraone completed a postdoctoral clinical psychology internship and a research fellowship at Brown University. His post-doctoral mentor was Ming T. Tsuang.

After completing his post-doctoral fellowship at Brown, Faraone came to the Harvard Department of Psychiatry, where he began a career in psychiatric genetics. He first served as an instructor in 1985, and as an assistant professor in 1989. He was promoted to associate professor in 1993 and Full Professor in 2002. In 2004, he moved to SUNY Upstate Medical University where he is now Distinguished Professor of Psychiatry and of Neuroscience and Physiology. He is also Senior Scientific Advisor to the Research Program Pediatric Psychopharmacology at the Massachusetts General Hospital and a lecturer at Harvard Medical School. Faraone has been principal investigator on several grants from the National Institutes of Health and the Patient-Centered Outcomes Research Institute studying the nature, causes and treatment of ADHD. He is one of the world's leading authorities on the genetics of psychiatric disorders and has also made substantial contributions to research in psychopharmacology and research methodology. He led the International Consensus Statement on ADHD, and heads The ADHD Evidence Project, which curates evidence-based information about ADHD.

Faraone is a member of the European ADHD Guidelines Group (EAGG) and has founded the ADHD Molecular Genetics Network and the American Professional Society of ADHD and Related Disorders.

== Awards and honors ==
Faraone has authored over 700 journal articles, editorials, chapters, and books, and was the eighth-highest producer of High Impact Papers in Psychiatry from 1990 to 1999 as determined by the Institute for Scientific Information (ISI). In 2005, ISI determined him to be the second-highest cited author in the area of ADHD and in 2007, he was the third most highly cited researcher in psychiatry for the preceding decade. From 2014 to 2021 he has been listed as a highly cited researcher by Thomson Reuters/Clarivate Analytics. In 2019 and 2020, his citation metrics placed him in the top 0.01% of scientists across all fields.

In 2002, Faraone was inducted into the CHADD Hall of Fame in recognition of outstanding achievement in medicine and education research on attention disorders. In 2004 and 2008, Faraone was elected vice president of the International Society of Psychiatric Genetics and in 2019 he received the Paul Hoch Award from the American Psychopathological Association. In 2008, he received the SUNY Upstate President's Award for Excellence and Leadership in Research. In 2019 he was elected president of the World Federation of ADHD. In 2022 he was elected to the Norwegian Academy of Science and Letters. In 2018 he received the Lifetime Achievement Award from the International Society of Psychiatric Genetics, in 2019 he received the Paul Hoch Award from the American Psychopathological Association and in 2026, he received the Joseph Biederman Lifetime Achievement Award from the American Professional Society of ADHD and Related Disorders.

== Research Funding and Financial Disclosures ==
Faraone's research has been funded by the U.S. National Institutes of Health, the Patient-Centered Outcomes Research Institute, the European Union and the following companies:

- Otsuka
- Shire/Takeda
- Ironshore
- McNeil
- Janssen
- Tris
- Supernus

He has received income or potential income from:

- Aardvark
- Aardwolf
- Otsuka
- Collegium
- Corium
- Supernus
- Mentavi
- AIMH
- Akili
- Alcobra
- Atentiv
- Aytu
- Axsome
- CogCubed
- Corium
- Eli Lilly
- Enzymotec
- Genomind
- Ironshore
- Janssen
- McNeil
- Neurolifesciences
- Neurovance
- Novartis
- Noven
- OnDosis
- Otsuka
- Pfizer
- Rhodes
- Shire
- Sunovion
- Takeda
- Sky Therapeutics
- Psyon
- Johnson & Johnson/Kenvue
- Vallon

With his institution, he has US patent US20130217707 A1 for the use of sodium-hydrogen exchange inhibitors in the treatment of ADHD. These disclosures are routinely reported in relevant publications.

== Books published ==
- Tsuang MT, Faraone SV. The Genetics of Mood Disorders, Baltimore, MD: Johns Hopkins; 1990
- Faraone SV, Tsuang, D, Tsuang MT. Genetics of Mental Disorders: A Guide for Students, Clinicians, and Researchers, New York, NY: Guilford;1999.
- Faraone, S.V. Straight Talk About Your Child's Mental Health: What To Do When Something Seems Wrong, New York, NY: Guilford, 2003.
- Tsuang MT, Faraone SV & Glatt SG Schizophrenia: The Facts, Oxford University Press; 2011.
- Faraone, S.V. & Antshel, K. ADHD: Non-Pharmacologic Interventions Elsevier, 2014
