= Genomic convergence =

Multifactor approach used in genetic research

Genomic convergence is a multifactor approach used in genetic research that combines different kinds of genetic data analysis to identify and prioritize susceptibility genes for a complex disease.

== Early applications ==
In January 2003, Michael Hauser along with fellow researchers at the Duke Center for Human Genetics (CHG) coined the term “genomic convergence” to describe their endeavor to identify genes affecting the expression of Parkinson's disease (PD). Their work successfully combined serial analysis of gene expression (SAGE) with genetic linkage analysis. The authors explain, “While both linkage and expression analyses are powerful on their own, the number of possible genes they present as candidates for PD or any complex disorder remains extremely large”. The convergence of the two methods allowed researchers to decrease the number of possible PD genes to consider for further study.

Their success prompted further use of the genomic convergence method at the CHG, and in July 2003 Yi-Ju Li, et al. published a paper revealing that glutathione S-transferase omega-1 (GSTO1) modifies the age of onset (AAO) of Alzheimer's disease (AD) and PD.

In May 2004, Margaret Pericak-Vance, currently the director of the John P. Hussman Institute for Human Genomics at the University of Miami Miller School of Medicine and then the director of the CHG, articulated the value of the genomic convergence method at a New York Academy of Sciences (NYAS) keynote address entitled "Novel Methods in Genetic Exploration of Neurodegenerative Disease." She stated, "No single method is going to get us where we need to be with these complex traits. It is going to take a combination of methods to dissect the underlying etiology of these disorders".

== Recent and future applications ==
Genomic convergence has a countless number of creative applications that combine the strengths of different analyses and studies. Maher Noureddine et al., note in their 2005 paper, “One of the growing problems in the study of complex diseases is how to prioritize research and make sense of the immense amount of data now readily available at the click of a computer mouse...The best approach may be to take advantage of the strengths of both…SAGE …and microarrays”.

The results of combining methods of analysis have continued to be promising. Sofia Oliveira et al. (2005) combined gene expression, linkage data, and “iterative association mapping” to identify several genes associated with PD AAO.

Future studies will continue to apply genomic convergence to elucidate the etiology of complex diseases. Dr. Jeff Vance, Director of the Morris K. Udall PD Research Center of Excellence, notes, “Genomic convergence is really no different from mathematical convergence – the more angles from which you can come at a problem, the better chance you have of solving it”.
