= Michael O'Donovan =

Michael O'Donovan may refer to:

- Frank O'Connor, born Michael Francis O'Donovan, Irish author and translator
- Michael C. O'Donovan, Scottish psychiatric geneticist
- Michael O'Donovan (Gaelic footballer), Irish Gaelic football coach and player

== See also ==
- Professor Mike Donovan, also known as Mike O'Donovan, American boxer
