= Michael C. O'Donovan =

Scottish psychiatric geneticist

- Education: Glasgow University; University of Wales
- Known for: Research on schizophrenia
- Awards: (with Michael Owen) Lieber Prize for Outstanding Achievement in Schizophrenia Research from the Brain & Behavior Research Foundation (2012)
- Scientific career
- Fields: Psychiatric genetics
- Institutions: Cardiff University School of Medicine

Michael C. O'Donovan is a Scottish psychiatric geneticist who researches the genetics of schizophrenia. He is a clinical professor in the Division of Psychological Medicine and Clinical Neurosciences and the deputy director of the MRC Centre for Neuropsychiatric Genetics and Genomics at the Cardiff University School of Medicine in Cardiff, Wales. He also leads the Schizophrenia Group of the Psychiatric Genomics Consortium. Educated at Glasgow University, he also serves as Academic Psychiatry Lead for the Royal College of Psychiatrists in Wales. He was lead author of a 2014 study in Nature which identified over 100 genetic loci associated with an increased risk of schizophrenia. The study, the largest of its kind undertaken at the time, was covered extensively in the media. It was also praised by Thomas Insel, the then-director of the National Institute of Mental Health, who described the study as "a big step forward".
