= Collaborative Study on the Genetics of Alcoholism =

Medical research institute in the United States

The Collaborative Studies on the Genetics of Alcoholism (COGA) is a ten-center research project in the United States designed to understand the genetic basis of alcoholism. Research is conducted at:

- Howard University
- Indiana University
- Icahn School of Medicine at Mount Sinai
- Rutgers University
- SUNY Downstate Medical Center
- University of California, San Diego
- University of Connecticut
- University of Iowa
- Perelman School of Medicine at University of Pennsylvania
- Washington University in St. Louis

Henri Begleiter and Theodore Reich were founding PI and Co-PI of COGA. Since 1991, COGA has interviewed more than 17,000 members of more than 2,200 families from around the United States, many of whom have been longitudinally assessed. Family members, including adults, children, and adolescents, have been carefully characterized across a variety of domains, including other alcohol and other substance-related phenotypes, co-occurring disorders (e.g., depression), electrophysiology, key precursor behavioral phenotypes (e.g., conduct disorder), and environmental risk factors (e.g., stress). This has provided a rich phenotypic dataset to complement the large repository of cell lines and DNA for current and future studies.

This dataset is widely available to advance the field: hundreds of researchers have worked with data generated as part of COGA through a variety of different mechanisms including data sharing through dbGaP and the Genetic Analysis Workshops, as COGA collaborators, through meta-analysis consortia including the Psychiatric Genomics Consortium, and as independent requestors for COGA samples and data.

In studying alcoholism, COGA hopes to find better ways of treating alcoholism and improving the lives of the millions of people who suffer from alcoholism. The COGA project has achieved national and international acclaim for its accomplishments, and numerous articles about the study have been published in scientific journals. This project is funded by the federal government (National Institute on Alcohol Abuse and Alcoholism) and is one of the largest of its kind to be done in the United States.

== Scientific mission ==
COGA's aim is to identify the genes involved in alcoholism. There is a large body of twin-studies and adoption-studies that show that the risk for alcoholism has a genetic component. COGA is trying to determine more specifically what genes are involved. There is no one gene that confers much risk for alcoholism, rather, thousands of variations in many genes contribute to the risk, as do many aspects of the environment. Examples of risk factors include one's level of response to alcohol, a person's neuroelectrochemistry, and other psychiatric disorders such as Antisocial Personality Disorder or clinical depression.

== Interviews ==
COGA researchers will interview subjects using the Semi-Structured Assessment for the Genetics of Alcoholism (SSAGA), specifically created for the COGA project. Each subject is asked to participate in the SSAGA, with different versions for adolescents and for parents being interviewed about their children. The SSAGA is a polydiagnostic psychiatric interview that covers any drug or alcohol use as well as any emotional and/or medical problems the subject may have experienced. The SSAGA is designed to use diagnostic criterion from the DSM III-R, DSM IV, and ICD-10. The SSAGA has been translated into nine languages and has been used in over 275 studies; researchers can use the SSAGA in their own projects. The wide adoption of the SSAGA ensures that data from COGA families are highly compatible with data from other studies and allows COGA to participate in numerous consortia that use meta-analytic methods to combine data and results.

== Blood sample ==
COGA requests that their subjects provide a blood sample, which is then processed and examined at Rutgers University. DNA is used to identify variations in genes that affect the risk for alcoholism and related disorders.

== Brain wave ==
The brain wave is called an event-related potential (ERP) and is similar to an EEG. Brainwaves are monitored in a non-invasive procedure that involves placing a cap, similar to a bathing cap, on the subject's head. This cap monitors the brain's natural electrical activity and records the brain's response when the subject is presented with various stimuli. Subjects respond to computer programs on a screen in front of them that flash various stimuli on the screen.

After a significant event, or an important stimuli to which the subject is instructed to respond, there is an increase in electrical activity. COGA is investigating, for example, the P3 (or P300) peak of the ERP that occurs approximately 300ms after the stimuli presentation. Varying amplitudes of the wave have different behavioral implications. The amplitude is fairly consistent throughout families and steady across time, suggesting an inherited component, as opposed to an environmental component.

== Publications ==
- The Collaborative Study on the Genetics of Alcoholism: An Update
- Alcoholism and Human Electrophysiology
- Defining Alcohol-Related Phenotypes in Humans
- New Findings in the Genetics of Alcoholism
- COGA Suggests Genetic Loci for P3 Brain Wave Abnormality
- Is There a Genetic Relationship Between Alcoholism and Depression?
