= Margaret Pericak-Vance =

American human geneticist

Margaret A. Pericak-Vance
- Born: Margaret Ann Pericak; June 28, 1951 (age 75)
- Education: Wells College; Indiana University School of Medicine Department of Medical and Molecular Genetics; University of North Carolina at Chapel Hill Department of Biostatistics
- Known for: Research on the genetics of Alzheimer's disease
- Spouse: Jeffery Marvin Vance
- Children: 3
- Awards: Grand Prix scientifique de la Fondation Louis D. (2001); National Academy of Medicine (2003); Alzheimer's Association's Bengt Winblad Lifetime Achievement Award (2011); Ming Tsuang Lifetime Achievement Award from the International Society of Psychiatric Genetics (2014); Lifetime Achievement Award from the American Society of Human Genetics (2024)
- Scientific career
- Fields: Medical genetics
- Workplaces: Duke University Medical Center; University of Miami Miller School of Medicine
- Thesis: Genetic linkage studies in Huntington's disease (1978)
- Doctoral advisor: P. Michael Conneally Post Doctoral Advisor: Robert C. Elston

Margaret Ann Pericak-Vance (born June 28, 1951) is an American human geneticist who is the Dr. John T. Macdonald Foundation Professor of Human Genetics and director of the John P. Hussman Institute for Human Genomics at the University of Miami. She is known for her research on the genetics of common human diseases. This research has led to a number of findings of genes that increase the risk of certain diseases, such as apolipoprotein E and Alzheimer's disease, interleukin-7 receptor and multiple sclerosis, and complement factor H and macular degeneration.

== Education and career ==
A native of Buffalo, New York, Pericak-Vance attended Wells College, graduating in 1973 with a bachelor's degree in biology. She went on to earn her Ph.D. in 1978 from Indiana University School of Medicine: Department of Medical and Molecular Genetics, where she studied under P. Michael Conneally. She did a post-doctoral fellowship at the University of North Carolina Chapel Hill under Robert C. Elston. She subsequently served on the faculty of Duke University, where she eventually became director of the Center for Human Genetics, James B. Duke Professor of Medicine, and Chief of the Section of Medical Genetics at Duke University Medical Center.

In January 2007, Pericak-Vance left Duke to help launch the Miami Institute for Human Genomics, which is now the John P. Hussman Institute for Human Genomics at the University of Miami's Miller School of Medicine.

== Scientific Contributions ==
=== Alzheimer's disease research ===
In 1993, Pericak-Vance and her colleagues identified the APOE-4 allele as a significant genetic risk factor for late-onset Alzheimer's disease. Their research demonstrated that individuals carrying this allele had an increased likelihood of developing the disease, making it the most significant genetic risk factor beyond age. Pericak-Vance and colleagues published a study in Science identifying the APOE-4 allele as a genetic risk factor for late-onset Alzheimer's disease, one of the first gene variants associated with a common neurological disorder. As of 2023, the study is the most-cited original research paper in Alzheimer's studies of the past 50 years.

In 1994, Pericak-Vance and her team demonstrated that the APOE-e2 allele had a protective effect against Alzheimer's disease, the earliest example of different alleles of the same gene having differing effects on disease susceptibility. Subsequent research has cited these findings as influential in shaping approaches to studying genetic risk and protection in complex diseases.

In 2018, Pericak-Vance co-authored a study examining the APOE-ε4 allele in Puerto Rican and African American populations, which highlighted how ancestry can moderate genetic risk for Alzheimer's disease.

In 2025, Pericak-Vance and colleagues analyzed the relationship between telomere length and cognitive impairment in Midwestern Amish populations in the context of understanding the process of age-related neurodegeneration. The team determined that telomere length decreased during aging — an expected finding, but found no significant results between cognition and telomere length.

== Honors and awards ==
Pericak-Vance is a founding fellow of the American College of Medical Genetics. She was recognized in 1997 by Popular Science Magazine for The Best of What's New in Science and Technology for the Gene Identified for Alzheimer's Disease. Also that year, Newsweek Magazine named her to "The Century Club: 100 People to Watch as We Move to the Next Millennium". In 2001, she received the Grand Prix scientifique de la Fondation Louis D. from the Institut de France for her research on Alzheimer's disease. She was inducted into the Western New York Women's Hall of Fame (2002) and received Wells College Distinguished Alumnae Award (2003) She was elected to the National Academy of Medicine in 2003. She received the Hauptman-Woodward pioneer of Science award in 2004. Dr. Pericak-Vance received the Alzheimer's Association's Bengt Winblad lifetime achievement award in 2011, and was named a fellow of the American Association for the Advancement of Science in 2012. In 2014, she received the Ming Tsuang Lifetime Achievement Award from the International Society of Psychiatric Genetics. She was Awarded the Plaza Health Network Foundation's Women of Distinction & Caring Award in 2019. In 2023, she was recognized by Research.com with the Best Scientist Award as well as the Best Female Scientist Award, and in 2024 with the Genetics in the United States Leader Award. In 2024, she was awarded the Lifetime Achievement Award by the American Society of Human Genetics which recognizes substantial and far-reaching scientific contributions to human genetics. The award recognized Pericak-Vance for her long career in human genetics and the impact her research has had on improving the understanding of inherited diseases, including both rare and common genetic conditions.

== Personal life ==
Pericak-Vance is married to Jeffery M. Vance, whom she met when they were both students at Indiana University School of Medicine. Together they had two sons and one daughter. Their son, Jeffery Joseph Vance, died in 1998 from thrombotic storm.
