= David L. Dunner =

American psychiatrist

David L. Dunner (born May 27, 1940, in Brooklyn, New York) is a psychiatrist in Washington, United States, who has conducted pioneering research into mood disorders, anxiety disorders and their treatment. He has authored or co-authored more than 250 articles and more than 10 books.

== Career outline ==
Dunner went to Washington University School of Medicine, where the psychiatry department was run along biological lines by Eli Robins. After residency in Philadelphia and back at St Louis, he worked at the National Institute for Mental Health for two years. Along with fellow researchers Frederick K. Goodwin and Elliot S. Gershon he developed the concept of what they called Bipolar II Disorder. Dunner notes that their influential 1976 paper on Bipolar II took six years to get published.

He then went to New York for eight years to work with Ronald R. Fieve on studies of Bipolar disorder and the emerging Lithium treatment, and developed the concept of 'rapid cycling' for bipolar disorder which was found to show less response to Lithium (he credits Canadian scientist Harvey Stancer for first noticing the connection a year prior). Dunner then moved back to Washington becoming professor at the University of Washington in Seattle and chief of psychiatry at Harborview Medical Centre. While there he set up The Center for Anxiety and Depression and became the foremost "clinical expert in bipolar disorder and treatment-resistant depression in the Seattle area". Since his medical residency he has been "involved in clinical studies of every single drug on the US market at least once, if not many times". He has also conducted studies of manualized psychotherapies compared to or combined with medication. He has remarked that he is disappointed they have not discovered the bipolar gene, which he and Elliot Gershon thought they would discover in the early 1970s.

== Titles and awards ==
Dunner has been president of the American Psychopathological Association (APPA), president of the Psychiatric Research Society and president of the Society of Biological Psychiatry. He has been editor of the journal Comprehensive Psychiatry. He has won the Samuel Hamilton Award and the Morton Prince Award from the APPA, the Robert Jones Lectureship from the Canadian Psychiatric Association, and the Ward Smith Award from the West Coast College of Biological Psychiatry.

== Pharmaceutical controversies ==
Dunner was on a 1991 FDA Psychopharmacologic Drugs Advisory Committee which advised that there was not sufficient evidence to support a proposal that antidepressant drugs could cause suicidality or other violent behaviors. However, 5 of the 9 members had financial links to pharmaceutical companies and Dunner in particular had extensive financial links both before and after the hearings with Prozac manufacturer Eli Lilly – the company which testified in person during the hearings. Dunner was subsequently involved in controversy over apparent links between Paxil (seroxat) and suicide/violence. When called to testify in 2001 regarding prior inaccurate data analyses used to conclude there was no link, he claimed to have published without seeing the actual data but only tables provided to him by employees of the drug manufacturer SmithKlineBeecham (now GlaxoSmithKline).
