= Niki Erlenmeyer-Kimling =

American psychiatrist (1932–2021)

Niki L. Erlenmeyer-Kimling
- Born: April 18, 1932
- Died: February 16, 2021 (aged 88)
- Scientific career
- Institutions: Columbia University

Columbia University Shield

Niki Erlenmeyer-Kimling (April 18, 1932 – February 16, 2021) was a professor of clinical psychiatry at Columbia University and chief of the Division of Genetics at New York State Psychiatric Institute. Before becoming a professor at Columbia University, Erlenmeyer-Kimling studied. Many awards and honors had been granted to her through the work she had accomplished and her studies.

== Education & Early Life ==
Niki’s parents were Floyd Erlenmeyer and Dorothy Dirst. She was an only child growing up living New Jersey and the New York Metropolitan area. She studied at the Latin Institute in New York. She would later go on to study at Columbia University before becoming a professor at the same institution (1954-1961). During her time at Columbia University, she took courses on Experimental Psychology and Genetics^{3}^{]}. Erlenmeyer-Kimling obtained her Doctorate degree to continue her work in psychology. For many years, she taught graduate courses at the New School for Social Research in New York City.

== Research ==
Her research interests included genetic aspects of mental disorders (mainly schizophrenia) and human behavior genetics generally. She conducted a longitudinal, prospective study of early indicators of later schizophrenia and a genetic-linkage, gene search study of schizophrenia in Croatia. Throughout Niki's career she had contributed to a total of 144 publications.

=== New York High-Risk Project ===
The New York High-Risk Project started in 1971. The project compared children’s probability of psychiatric disorders to both their parents. Children who had one parent with prior disorders were 10%-25% likely to also have disorders. Children with both parents who had psychiatric disorders were 35%-35% more likely to have a disorder. The goal of the project was to determine how schizophrenia in parents would affect the children's probability to also have similar disorders.

== Honors ==
Her honors included Phi Beta Kappa, Sigma Xi, the Dobzhansky Award, a National Institute of Mental Health Merit Award, the Warren Schizophrenia Research Award, an honorary doctorate of the State University of New York, a Lifetime Achievement Award from the International Society of Psychiatric Genetics, and a NARSAD Distinguished Investigator Award.
