= Sarah Romans =

New Zealand academic psychiatrist

- Other names: Sarah E. Romans; Sarah Romans-Clarkson
- Occupation: Psychiatrist

Academic background
- Education: University of Otago

Sarah E. Romans FRANZCP is a New Zealand academic psychiatrist and Emerita Professor at the University of Otago.

== Academic career ==
Romans holds a Bachelor of Medicine and Bachelor of Surgery and Doctor of Medicine from the University of Otago. She moved to the University of Toronto where she researched gender differences and depression. She returned to the University of Otago and was appointed a full professor, effective 1 February 2011. As of 2020 she is Professor Emerita at the University of Otago and also conducts a private psychiatric practice for adults.

== Selected works ==
- David X Li; Romans, Sarah; Mary Jane De Souza; Murray, Brian; Gillian Einstein (2015). "Actigraphic and self-reported sleep quality in women: associations with ovarian hormones and mood". Sleep Medicine. 16 (10): 1217–1224. doi:10.1016/j.sleep.2015.06.009. PMID 26429749. Wikidata Q40474713.
- Romans, Sarah; Rose F Clarkson; Gillian Einstein; David Kreindler; Sheila Laredo; Michele J Petrovic; James Stanley (2016). "Crying, oral contraceptive use and the menstrual cycle". Journal of Affective Disorders. 208: 272–277. doi:10.1016/j.jad.2016.08.044. PMID 27794250. Wikidata Q38802849.
- Susanna Every-Palmer; Romans, Sarah; Richard Stubbs; Anneka Tomlinson; Sophie Gandhi; Mark Huthwaite (2020). "Experiences of Weight-Loss Surgery in People With Serious Mental Illness: A Qualitative Study". Frontiers in Psychiatry. 11: 419. doi:10.3389/fpsyt.2020.00419. PMC 7236816. PMID 32477191. Wikidata Q96023186.
