= Cynthia M. Bulik =

American psychologist and author

Cynthia Marie Bulik
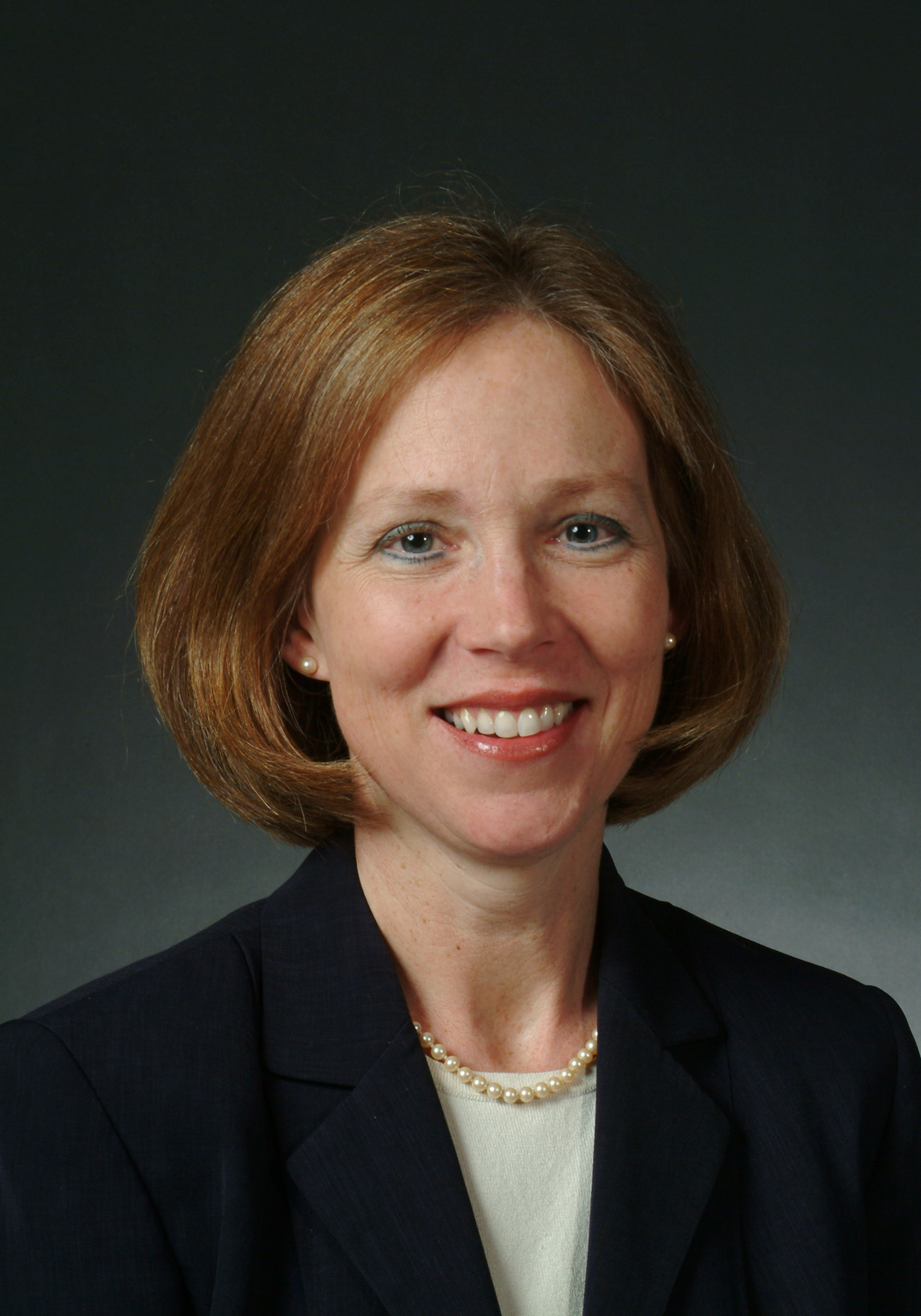
- Bulik in 2007
- Born: February 13, 1960; Pittsburgh, PA, USA
- Education: BA, University of Notre Dame; MA, PhD, University of California, Berkeley
- Spouse: Patrick F. Sullivan, FRANZCP
- Scientific career
- Institutions: University of North Carolina at Chapel Hill, Karolinska Institutet
- Doctoral advisor: Sheldon Korchin, PhD
- Website: www.cynthiabulik.com

Cynthia Marie Bulik is an American psychologist and author.

Bulik is perhaps best known for her clinical work and research on eating disorders in the United States. She is the Founding Director of the University of North Carolina Center of Excellence for Eating Disorders, the founder and director of the Centre for Eating Disorders Innovation at Karolinska Institutet in Stockholm, Sweden, a Distinguished Professor of Eating Disorders in the Department of Psychiatry of the School of Medicine at University of North Carolina at Chapel Hill, and a professor of Nutrition in the Gillings School of Global Public Health. Bulik is also professor in the Department of Medical Epidemiology and Biostatistics at Karolinska Institutet in Stockholm, Sweden, where she directs the Centre for Eating Disorders Innovation. She also holds an adjunct appointment at the Norwegian Institute of Public Health.

== Career ==
Bulik has been involved in the research and treatment of individuals with eating disorders since 1982. She received her BA from the University of Notre Dame and her MA and PhD in clinical psychology from the University of California, Berkeley. She completed internships and post-doctoral fellowships at the Western Psychiatric Institute and Clinic in Pittsburgh, PA.

Bulik has developed outpatient, partial hospitalization, and inpatient services for eating disorders both in New Zealand and in the United States. Her research includes treatment, laboratory, animal, epidemiological, twin, and molecular genetic studies of eating disorders and body weight regulation. She applies information technology to the treatment of eating disorders and obesity to broaden the reach, and increase the success of newly developed interventions.

Bulik is co-chair and founder of the Eating Disorders Workgroup of the Psychiatric Genomics Consortium. She was also the director of the first NIMH-sponsored Post-Doctoral Training Program in Eating Disorders. She has had continuous federal, international, and foundation funding since 1985. Dr. Bulik has written over 520 scientific papers and 60 chapters on eating disorders and is author of the books Eating Disorders: Detection and Treatment, Runaway Eating: The 8 Point Plan to Conquer Adult Food and Weight Obsessions, Crave: Why You Binge Eat and How To Stop, Abnormal Psychology, The Woman in the Mirror, Midlife Eating Disorders, and Binge Control.

== Awards, Recognition, and Leadership ==
Bulik is a recipient of the Eating Disorders Coalition Research Award, the Hulka Innovators Award, the Academy for Eating Disorders Leadership Award for Research, the Price Family National Eating Disorders Association Research Award, the Carolina Women's Center Women's Advocacy Award, the Women's Leadership Council Faculty-to-Faculty Mentorship Award, IAEDP Honorary Certified Eating Disorders Specialist Award, the František Faltus Award from the Czech Psychiatric Society, the AED Meehan/Hartley Award for Advocacy, the Hilde Bruch Award, and the Don and Melissa Nielsen Lifetime Achievement Award from the National Eating Disorders Association.

Bulik is a past president of the Academy for Eating Disorders, past Vice-President of the Eating Disorders Coalition, and past Associate Editor of the International Journal of Eating Disorders. She was the Founding Chair of the Scientific Advisory Council of the Binge Eating Disorder Association and is a member of the Scientific Advisory Committee of the Global Foundation for Eating Disorders. Bulik also serves on the Clinical Advisory Board for Project HEAL.

Bulik has appeared on the Today Show, Good Morning America, CNN Morning, Katie, Dr. Oz, Dr. Phil and Rachael Ray, in addition to national news programs in New Zealand, Australia, and Sweden. She has been featured in many publications, including The New York Times, The Washington Post, USA Today, Newsweek, Time, and U.S. News & World Report. Bulik holds the first endowed professorship in eating disorders in the United States.

== Personal life ==
Bulik is married and the mother of three. She won a bronze medal in the 2012 Adult National Figure Skating Championships with partner David Tsai.
