= Anne Farmer =

Psychiatrist

- Citizenship: United Kingdom
- Spouse: Peter McGuffin
- Scientific career
- Fields: psychiatry
- Institutions: Institute of Psychiatry; University of Wales, Cardiff

Anne Farmer is emeritus professor of psychiatric nosology at the Institute of Psychiatry and was formerly lead consultant in the Affective Disorders Unit at the South London and Maudsley NHS Foundation Trust and the trust's director of medical education. Farmer's focus is on genetic research in affective disorders. Farmer was previously professor of psychiatry at the University of Wales College of Medicine.

== Education and career ==
Anne Farmer was educated at Folkestone School for Girls and Leeds University. She graduated from Leeds Medical School in 1972 and did her residency training in psychiatry in Leeds and London, UK. In 1980 she worked for 18 months at the Washington University School of Medicine in St Louis, with Drs Lee Robins, John Helzer and Linda Cotler, as a member of the Epidemiological Catchment Area (ECA) study research team. Her doctorate, awarded in 1987, applied novel statistical procedures to the psychopathology of schizophrenia to refine the classification.

After 4 years as a clinical lecturer at the Institute of Psychiatry in London, she was appointed first as senior lecturer, then professor of psychiatry at the University of Wales College of Medicine in Cardiff, Wales. She returned to the Institute of Psychiatry and Maudsley Hospital in London in 1998, where she was appointed professor of psychiatric nosology.

She has written over 200 peer reviewed papers, as well as numerous book chapters, review articles and editorials on wide-ranging research interests, including classification, the aetiology of schizophrenia and affective disorders, chronic fatigue syndrome and ethical aspects of genetic research. Current research includes investigating genetic and environmental risk factors for unipolar and bipolar affective disorders, genetically determined response to antidepressants and cognitive changes in mania.

== Research ==
The following is a list of Dr. Farmer's research roles, including grant totals and institutions, between 2007 and 2010: 2008. Principal Investigator for a genome wide association study of unipolar depression. Grant of £1.2 million over two years. Medical Research Council (United Kingdom) and GlaxoSmithKline Pharmaceuticals; 2007. Principal Investigator for an MRI study on a sub-sample of the Gendep Human Pharmacogenetics Study. Grant of £100,000 over six months. GlaxoSmithKline Pharmaceuticals; 2007. Principal Investigator for a whole genome association study of unipolar depression. Grant of £630,000 over three years. Medical Research Council; 2007. Principal Investigator on a programme of research to develop and test stepped care for patients with depression and symptomatic coronary heart disease in primary care. Grant of £1.99m over five years. NIHR Programme.

== Selected bibliography ==
- Farmer, Anne; Elkin, Amanda; Mcguffin, Peter (2007), "The genetics of bipolar affective disorder", Current Opinion in Psychiatry, 20 (1): 8–12, doi:10.1097/yco.0b013e3280117722, ISSN 0951-7367, PMID 17143075, S2CID 1512643
- Farmer, Anne; McGuffin, P; Williams, Julie (2002), Measuring psychopathology, Oxford, ISBN 9781417599479
