= Nick Craddock =

British psychiatrist

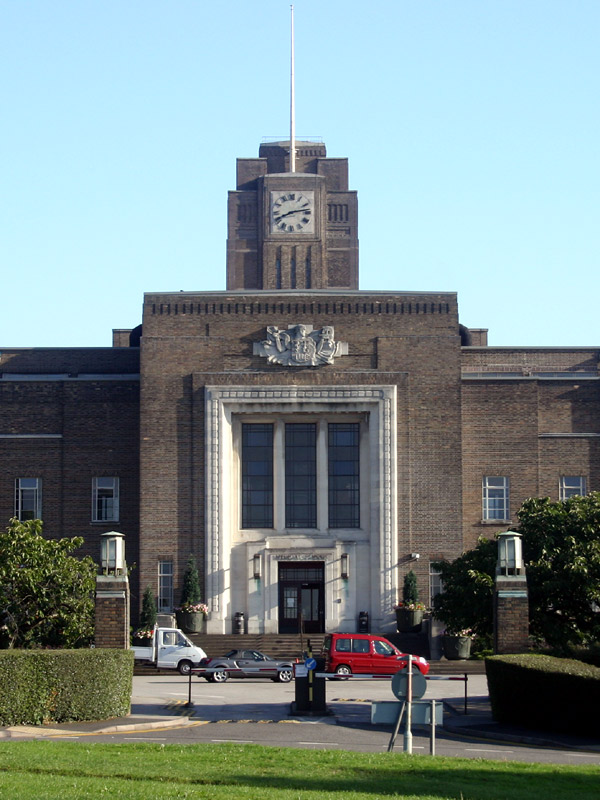
Birmingham University Medical School

Nick Craddock is a British psychiatrist, the director of the National Centre for Mental Health and professor of psychiatry at Cardiff University in Wales. He specialises in the diagnosis and management of mood and psychotic illness. His interests include psychiatric genetics and genome-wide association studies.

== Early life ==
He graduated from Birmingham University with a degree in medicine in 1985. He is a fellow of the Academy of Medical Sciences, fellow and honorary treasurer of the Royal College of Psychiatrists, and past president of the International Society of Psychiatric Genetics. He is scientific advisor to Bipolar UK.

Craddock was awarded the Stromgren medal for psychiatric research in 2011, and the honorary degree of Doctor of Medicine (MD) by Birmingham University in 2014.
