= Convergent Functional Genomics =

Convergent Functional Genomics (CFG)

Developed by Alexander Niculescu, MD, PhD, and collaborators starting in 1999, it is an approach for identifying and prioritizing candidate genes and biomarkers for complex psychiatric and medical disorders by integrating and tabulating multiple lines of evidence- gene expression and genetic data, from human studies and animal model work. Developed independently but conceptually analogous to Google PageRank. The more lines of evidence for a gene (links), the higher it comes up on the CFG prioritization list. CFG represents a fit-to-disease approach, that extracts and prioritizes in a Bayesian fashion biologically relevant signal even from limited size studies. That signal is predictive and is reproducible in independent studies, as opposed to the fit-to-cohort aspect of classic human genetic studies like Genome-wide association study (GWAS), where the issue of genetic heterogeneity makes the top statistically significant findings from even large size studies less reproducible in independent studies.
