= Jürg Ott =

Swiss statistical geneticist

- Citizenship: Switzerland
- Awards: William Allan Award (2010); Ming Tsuang Lifetime Award (2008)
- Scientific career
- Fields: statistical genetics
- Institutions: Rockefeller University

Jürg Ott is Emeritus Professor of statistical genetics at Rockefeller University, New York.

== Awards and recognition ==
In 2008, Ott received the Ming Tsuang Lifetime Achievement Award Lifetime Achievement Award from the International Society of Psychiatric Genetics. In 2010 he won the William Allan Award at the American Society of Human Genetics.

== Published works ==
Ott, Jurg (1999). Analysis of human genetic linkage. Baltimore: Johns Hopkins University Press. ISBN 978-0-8018-6140-6. OCLC 39811646.
