= Elliot S. Gershon =

American psychiatrist and geneticist

Elliot S. Gershon (born in 1940) is a professor of psychiatry and human genetics at the University of Chicago in the United States. He served as chair of its department of psychiatry from 1998 to 2004, and chief of the Clinical Neurogenetics branch of the NIMH. He held a NARSAD distinguished investigator grant from 1998 to 2006, and won the 1996 Falcone prize for Outstanding Achievement in Affective Disorders Research.

His research from early in his career focused on the genetics of bipolar disorder and schizophrenia. He co-authored a 1976 paper with Frederick K. Goodwin and David L. Dunner which introduced the concept of bipolar II disorder.

His current clinical interests are listed as bipolar disorders, major depression and genetic counseling 'in Psych'.

He received a MD from Harvard Medical School and a BA from Harvard College.
