= Hagop S. Akiskal =

Armenian-American psychiatrist

Hagop Souren Akiskal
- Յակոբ Սուրէն Աքըսգալ
- Born: January 16, 1944; Beirut, Lebanon
- Died: January 20, 2021 (aged 77); La Jolla, San Diego, California
- Education: American University of Beirut
- Employer(s): University of Tennessee, Memphis, National Institute of Mental Health, University of California, San Diego
- Known for: Clinical psychiatrist, researcher, professor

Hagop Souren Akiskal (Armenian: Յակոբ Սուրէն Աքըսգալ; 16 January 1944 – 20 January 2021) was a Lebanese-born American psychiatrist and professor, of Armenian descent. He is best known for his research on temperament and bipolar disorder (manic depression), revolutionizing the field of clinical psychiatry.

== Biography ==
Hagop Souren Akiskal was born on 16 January 1944, in Beirut, Lebanon, to Armenian parents.

He received his M.D. from the American University of Beirut in 1969. He completed his residency training in psychiatry at University of Wisconsin–Madison. Akiskal then worked for several years as a clinician and mood disorders researcher and Professor of Psychiatry and Pharmacology at the University of Tennessee, Memphis. He was senior science advisor at NIMH from 1990 to 1994, before moving to the University of California, San Diego.

Akiskal was a leading conceptual thinker in the area of bipolar sub-typing. He was a fastidious researcher and an astute clinical observer. He was a devotee of Emil Kraepelin; he believed that the nosologic (classification) pendulum is gradually swinging back towards Kraepelin's original unitary concept of the bipolar spectrum of mood disorders (Lieber, Arnold).

Akiskal rose to prominence with his integrative theory of depression. Subsequently, he established chronic depressions as treatable mood disorders. His research on cyclothymia paved the way for understanding the childhood antecedents of bipolarity, and helped in the worldwide renaissance of the temperament field. His focus on subthreshold mood disorders enlarged the boundaries of bipolar disorders. He received the gold medal for Pioneer Research (Society of Biological Psychiatry), the German Anna Monika Prize for Depression, the NARSAD Prize for Affective Disorders, the 2002 Jean Delay Prize for international collaborative research (World Psychiatric Association), as well as the French Jules Baillarger and the Italian Aretaeus Prizes for his research on the bipolar spectrum.

Akiskal has pioneered in the study of outpatient mood disorders. At the University of Tennessee, he established mood clinics which have had worldwide appeal because of his philosophy of conducting clinical training and research while delivering high quality care. His clinical expertise ranged from dysthymia to bipolar spectrum disorders, as well as comorbidity, resistant depression, interface of personality with mood disorders, mixed states, anxious bipolarity, and PTSD. In 2003, he received the Ellis Island Medal of Honor "for exceptional national humanitarian service."

He was a highly prolific writer of articles in psychiatry and the editor of several academic journals, including serving as a co-Editor-in-Chief of the Journal of Affective Disorders. He has received a number of honors for his work on temperament and bipolar spectrum disorders.

Akiskal died of natural causes on January 20, 2021, at age 77, in La Jolla in San Diego, California.

== See also ==
- List of Ig Nobel Prize winners
