= Pamela Sklar =

American psychiatrist and neuroscientist

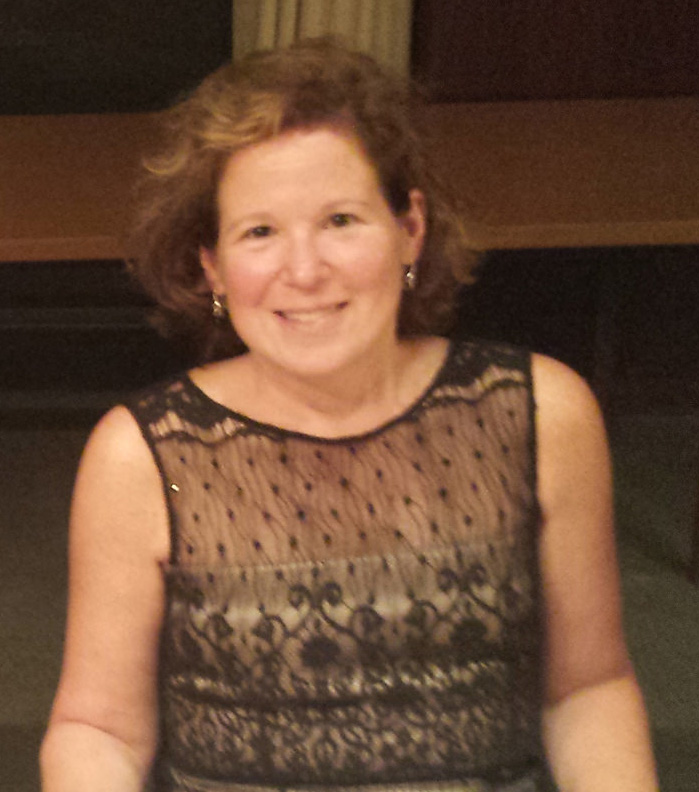
- Born: July 20, 1959; Baltimore, Maryland, U.S.
- Died: November 20, 2017 (aged 58)
- Education: St. John's College; Johns Hopkins University School of Medicine
- Scientific career
- Fields: Neuroscience; Genomics; Psychiatry
- Workplaces: Icahn School of Medicine at Mount Sinai

Pamela Sklar (born July 20, 1959, in Baltimore, Maryland - died November 20, 2017, in New York City) was an American psychiatrist and neuroscientist. She was Chair of the Department of Genetics and Genomic Sciences and professor of psychiatry, neuroscience, and genetic and genomic sciences at the Icahn School of Medicine at Mount Sinai. She was also chief of the Division of Psychiatric Genomics at the Icahn School of Medicine at Mount Sinai. Sklar is known for her large-scale gene discovery studies in bipolar disorder and schizophrenia and for making some of the first statistically meaningful gene identifications in both mental illnesses.

== Education ==
Sklar completed her bachelor's degree in classics and philosophy at St. John's College in 1981. She went on to complete her MD and then her PhD in neuroscience at Johns Hopkins School of Medicine. She carried out her residency in psychiatry at Columbia University Medical School, where she also carried out postdoctoral work in the laboratory of Richard Axel.

== Research ==
Sklar's research and clinical work focused on characterizing the biology underlying mental illnesses, in particular schizophrenia and bipolar disorder. Her studies of DNA variation have identified both common and rare genetic changes associated with these disorders. While working at the Broad Institute, Sklar co-founded the Stanley Center for Psychiatric Research and served as its genetics director. By studying thousands of affected individuals and comparing them with thousands of healthy people, she was the first to associate recurrent large deletions of DNA with the onset of schizophrenia and also found the first broadly reproducible genetic variants in schizophrenia as well as bipolar disorder using genome-wide association studies. Sklar and her colleagues discovered a molecular basis for polygenicity in schizophrenia among both rare and common DNA alterations and that schizophrenia and bipolar disorder are genetically linked through DNA variants that contribute to both illnesses. In 2011, Sklar joined the Icahn School of Medicine at Mount Sinai and became founding chief of the Division of Psychiatric Genomics there. The division's scope includes stem cell biology, neurocognition, statistical genetics, and imaging approaches to elucidate the biological variation causing mental illness. While at Mount Sinai, Sklar published papers demonstrating that schizophrenia is linked to many ultra-rare genetic variants. Sklar served as a principal investigator for the Psychiatric Genomics Consortium, the largest international collaboration in the psychiatric community. She helped lead the consortium's working group on bipolar disorder. She also co-founded the International Schizophrenia Consortium. After she died, Icahn School of Medicine renamed their Division of Psychiatric Genomics in her honor.

Sklar edited the textbook Neurobiology of Mental Illness, and published more than 140 peer-reviewed scientific papers.

She was elected to the National Academy of Medicine in 2013.

== Selected publications ==
- Ferreira MAR, O’Donovan MC, Meng YA, Jones IR, et al. Purcell SP, Sklar P and Craddock N (2008) Collaborative genome-wide association analysis of 10,596 individuals support a role for Ankyrin-G (ANK3) and the alpha-1C subunit of the L-type voltage-gated calcium channel (CACNA1C) in bipolar disorder. Nat Genet 40:1056-8.
- International Schizophrenia Consortium, Stone JL, O'Donovan MC, Gurling H, Kirov GK, et al., Sklar P (2008) Rare chromosomal deletions and duplications increase risk of schizophrenia. Nature 455:237-41.
- International Schizophrenia Consortium. Purcell SM, Wray NR, Stone JL, Visscher PM, O'Donovan MC, Sullivan PF, Sklar P (2009) Common polygenic variation contributes to risk of schizophrenia that overlaps with bipolar disorder. Nature 460:748-52.
- Psychiatric GWAS Consortium Bipolar Disorder Working Group. (2011) Large-scale genome-wide association analysis of bipolar disorder identifies a new susceptibility locus near ODZ4. Nat Genet. 43:977-83.
- Fromer M, Pocklington AJ, Kavanagh DH, Williams HJ, Dwyer S, Gormley P, Georgieva L, Rees E, Palta P, Ruderfer DM, Carrera N, Humphreys I, Johnson JS, Roussos P, Barker DD, Banks E, Milanova V, Grant SG, Hannon E, Rose SA, Chambert K, Mahajan M, Scolnick EM, Moran JL, Kirov G, Palotie A, McCarroll SA, Holmans P, Sklar P, Owen MJ, Purcell SM, O'Donovan MC. De novo mutations in schizophrenia implicate synaptic networks. Nature. 2014 506:179-84.
- Purcell SM, Moran JL, Fromer M, Ruderfer D, Solovieff N, Roussos P, O'Dushlaine C, Chambert K, Bergen SE, Kähler A, Duncan L, Stahl E, Genovese G, Fernández E, Collins MO, Komiyama NH, Choudhary JS, Magnusson PK, Banks E, Shakir K, Garimella K, Fennell T, DePristo M, Grant SG, Haggarty SJ, Gabriel S, Scolnick EM, Lander ES, Hultman CM, Sullivan PF, McCarroll SA, Sklar P. A polygenic burden of rare disruptive mutations in schizophrenia. Nature. 2014 506:185-90

== Obituaries ==
- Daly, Mark (2018-01-30). "Obituary: Pamela Sklar (1959–2017)". Nature. 554 (7690): 32. doi:10.1038/d41586-018-01382-x. PMID 29388987.
- Nestler, Eric J. (2017). "Pamela Sklar (1959–2017)". Cell. 171 (7): 1469–1470. doi:10.1016/j.cell.2017.11.046.
