= Ronald R. Fieve =

American psychiatrist

Ronald Robert Fieve (March 5, 1930, Stevens Point – January 2, 2018, Palm Beach) was an American psychiatrist known for his work on the use of lithium in treatment of mood disorders. He has authored four popular science books, "Moodswing", "Bipolar II", "Prozac" and "Bipolar Breakthrough".

Fieve received his medical degree from Harvard Medical School and started his residency in internal medicine at Cornell's New York Hospital before switching after a year to New York State Psychiatric Institute/Columbia-Presbyterian Medical Center. However he did not find the psychoanalytic approach useful for his patients. He was advised by his department head Lawrence Kolb to investigate reports coming out of Denmark and Australia about lithium (starting with John Cade). Fieve and colleagues conducted the first controlled trial of Lithium for depression (published in 1968), which had an impact despite its limitations, and he set up the first lithium clinic in North America in 1966. He also worked with the chemical rubidium for ten years.

Fieve notes that when he presented his lithium findings along with Ralph Wharton in 1966, it drew a lot of attention from the American public as it seemed to be the first medication that specifically treated a specific psychiatric disorder. In the same year he was appointed to a lithium taskforce convened by the Food and Drug Administration (FDA), and their conclusions resulted in the FDA approving lithium for mania in 1970.

In the 1970s Fieve appeared on numerous national TV talk shows extolling the virtues of lithium for 'manic depression', along with former patient and famous playwright Joshua Logan. 'Moodswing' was published in 1975 and by 1980 the English language version alone had sold over a million copies. Psychiatrist Nassir Ghaemi has said the book "introduced America to BD and lithium" and that 30 years later 'Bipolar II' has been among the first to "introduce the bipolar spectrum concept to the public".

Also in the 1970s Fieve, Joseph L. Fleiss and David L. Dunner were instrumental in drawing attention to the concepts of 'hypomania' (lower intensity mania) and the related diagnosis of Bipolar II disorder. They published an influential article in 1976, though Fieve credits the term 'Bipolar II' to Dunner and colleagues while at the NIMH in the early 70s before their work together in New York. Fieve and Dunner then coined the term 'rapid cycling', published in 1974, for those patients with more than four mood changes per year which seemed to correlate with failure to respond therapeutically to lithium. These concepts have been reflected in the Diagnostic and Statistical Manual of Mental Disorders (DSM) since the 1990s.

Since 1975 he held senior posts at the New York State Psychiatric Institute, Columbia University and the Presbyterian Hospital.

Fieve had a private practice and research offices in Manhattan, New York, US and at the Columbia-Presbyterian Medical Center. Actress Patty Duke in 2010 described Fieve's New York practice as 'crammed with Wall Street tycoons and Hollywood producers'.

== Publications ==
- Dunner, David L., and Ronald R. Fieve. "Clinical factors in lithium carbonate prophylaxis failure." Archives of General Psychiatry 30, no. 2 (1974): 229–233.
- Lawrence Sharpe, Joyce R. Alexander et al. "A possible vulnerability locus for bipolar affective disorder on chromosome 21q22. 3." Nature Genetics 8, no. 3 (1994): 291–296.
- Fieve, Ronald R., Stanley R. Platman, and ROBERT H. PLUTCHIK. "The use of lithium in affective disorders: I. Acute endogenous depression." American Journal of Psychiatry 125, no. 4 (1968): 487–491.
- Stallone, Frank, Edward Shelley, Julien Mendlewicz, and Ronald R. Fieve. "The use of lithium in affective disorders, III: a double-blind study of prophylaxis in bipolar illness."American Journal of Psychiatry 130, no. 9 (1973): 1006–1010.
- MENDLEWICZ, JULIEN, RONALD R. FIEVE, and FRANK STALLONE. "Relationship between the effectiveness of lithium therapy and family history." American Journal of Psychiatry 130, no. 9 (1973): 1011–1013.
