= Patrick F. Sullivan =

American psychiatric geneticist

- Born: St. Paul, Minnesota, United States
- Education: University of Notre Dame (BS, Biology, 1981); University of California, San Francisco (MD, 1988)
- Known for: Genetics of schizophrenia
- Spouse: Cynthia M. Bulik, PhD
- Children: Brendan Bulik-Sullivan
- Awards: Fellow of the American Association for the Advancement of Science
- Scientific career
- Fields: Psychiatric genetics
- Institutions: University of North Carolina at Chapel Hill; Karolinska Institute

Patrick F. Sullivan FRANZCP is an American psychiatric geneticist. He is the Yeargen Distinguished Professor of Psychiatry and Genetics at the University of North Carolina at Chapel Hill, where he is also the director of the Center for Psychiatric Genomics and the lead principal investigator of the Psychiatric Genomics Consortium. He is also a professor at the Karolinska Institutet in Stockholm, Sweden. His research focuses on the genetics of schizophrenia, major depressive disorders such as post-partum depression, eating disorders, and autism.
