= Nan Waddy =

Australian psychiatrist

Nanette Stacy Waddy AC MBE (4 May 1915 – 20 June 2015) was an Australian psychiatrist, who spoke out against the mistreatment of mental patients at Gladesville and Callan Park Mental Hospitals in the 1950s. Later she provided input to the development of Australian government policy in the field of drug and alcohol abuse.

== Early life and education ==
Waddy was born on 4 May 1915 in Godalming, eldest daughter of Dr Granville and Dorothy (née Hensley) Waddy. She completed her secondary education at Ascham and her first year of medicine at the University of Sydney, then in 1936 studied nursing at Royal Prince Alfred Hospital. She returned to university and graduated in 1941 with an MB BS and winning the Norton Manning Prize in psychiatry.

== Career ==
On graduation, her first job was resident medical officer at Tamworth Base Hospital in 1941. In 1942 she enlisted in the Women's Auxiliary Australian Air Force (WAAAF) as a medical officer, being discharged in 1948 with the rank of squadron leader.

In 1953, she began work in the tuberculosis ward at Callan Park Mental Hospital, but resigned the following year over the mistreatment of patients. She submitted a Statutory Declaration to the Minister for Health and called for an independent investigation into procedures which she believed were to the detriment of patients' health.

In the mid-1970s, Waddy was a member, spokesman and later president of the NSW Doctors Reform Society and spoke out against the introduction of Medicare.

From 1982 to 1987, Waddy was president of the Australian Foundation on Alcoholism and Drug Dependence. In that role she contributed to the government policy relating in particular to Australia's response to drugs.

== Awards and recognition ==
In 1977, Waddy was elected Fellow of the Royal Australian and New Zealand College of Psychiatrists (FRANZCP). She was made a Member of the Order of the British Empire (MBE) in the 1978 New Years honours for service to medicine. She was made a Companion of the Order of Australia (AC) in the 1988 Queen's Birthday honours for "service to medical education and to the community particularly in the field of drug and alcohol abuse". In 1988 she was also awarded an MD (Honoris Causa) by the University of Sydney.

== Personal ==
In 1948, Waddy married Dr Russell Godby (5 September 1912 – 27 May 1969), a specialist in the treatment of tuberculosis. Waddy died on 20 June 2015. She was survived by her son, grandchildren and great-grandchildren.
