= Ming T. Tsuang =

Taiwanese psychiatric geneticist (born 1931)

- 莊明哲
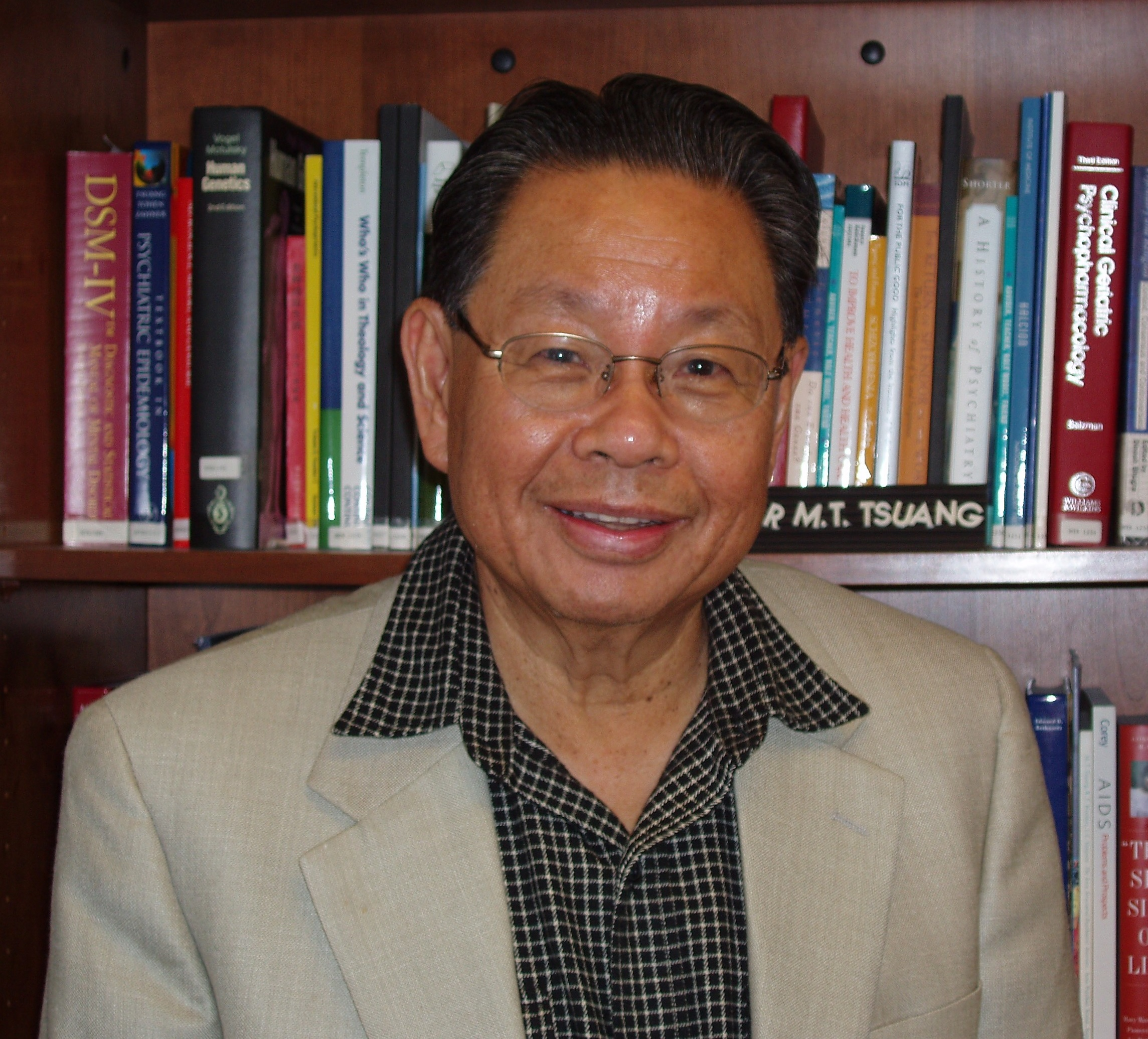
- Born: November 16, 1931 (age 94); Tainan, Taiwan
- Education: National Taiwan University (MD); University of London (DSc, PhD)
- Known for: family-genetic studies of psychiatric disorders, including the genetic heterogeneity of schizophrenia; research in bipolar manic-depressive illness and substance abuse
- Scientific career
- Fields: Psychiatry
- Workplaces: Washington University in St. Louis; University of California, San Diego; Harvard University
- Thesis: A study of sibling pairs with psychiatric disorders (1965)
- Doctoral advisor: Eliot Slater

Ming Tso Tsuang (Chinese: 莊明哲; pinyin: Zhuāng Míngzhé; born November 16, 1931) is a Taiwanese psychiatrist. He is the Stanley Cobb Professor of Psychiatry Emeritus at Harvard University and the Behavioral Genomics Endowed Chair and University Professor at the University of California, San Diego, where he is a professor emeritus. He is considered a pioneering researcher in the genetic epidemiology of schizophrenia and other severe mental disorders. Tsuang has authored and co-authored more than 600 publications and serves as founding and senior editor of the American Journal of Medical Genetics Part B.

== Early life and education ==
Tsuang was born in Tainan, Taiwan, on November 16, 1931. He was raised in Anping District, Tainan. After attending National Tainan First Senior High School, he graduated from National Taiwan University with a Doctor of Medicine (M.D.) in 1957. He then pursued doctoral studies in medicine in England at the University of London, where he earned his Ph.D. in psychiatric genetics in 1965 under psychiatrist Eliot Slater at Maudsley Hospital and later earned a Doctor of Science (D.Sc.) in psychiatric epidemiology in 1981.

== Career ==
Tsuang holds positions at the University of California, San Diego, as a Distinguished University Professor of Psychiatry and director of the Center for Behavioral Genomics. At Harvard University, Tsuang directs the Harvard Institute of Psychiatric Epidemiology and Genetics, which he created.

Tsuang's former positions with Harvard Medical School include: Stanley Cobb Professor of Psychiatry, chairman of the Department of Psychiatry and president and superintendent of Massachusetts Mental Health Center. He was the fourth president of the International Society of Psychiatric Genetics (ISPG) and served from 2005 to 2010.

=== Work ===
Tsuang's research interests include the effects of genetic and environmental risk factors on severe mental disorders. His work focuses on preventing the onset of severe mental disorders such as schizophrenia by determining which genetic and environmental traits can lead to their onset.

After earning his doctorate degrees, Tsuang began working in 1971 at Washington University School of Medicine's Department of Psychiatry. One year later, he transitioned to the Roy J. and Lucille A. Carver College of Medicine, where he developed the Iowa 500, the first double-blind psychiatric study of families to follow up with as many index patients and their family members as possible. The preliminary results of the study suggested genetics can affect a person's liability to schizophrenia and mood disorders. The Iowa 500 and the Iowa non-500 (the study of the people excluded from the Iowa 500 sample) have informed subsequent work in psychopathology.

In 1982, Tsuang joined Alpert Medical School as a researcher and started a new stage of the Collaborative Perinatal Project (CPP). The new stage, known as the New England Family Study, assessed and followed up with a large cohort of infants whose parents had both affective and non-affective psychotic disorders. The years-long study sought the psychological effect of prenatal and early life risk conditions on the infants and found that perinatal complications do not lead to an increased risk of psychological disorder; however, infants with chronic fetal hypoxia-like symptoms did show a higher risk of cognitive impairment and psychotic disorders, including schizophrenia. The study preceded future studies of the influence perinatal complications, infections during pregnancy and family history have on predicting neuropsychiatric outcomes, physical conditions and learning disorders.

In 1985, Tsuang began working at Harvard Medical School and the Harvard T.H. Chan School of Public Health, for which he initiated a National Institute of Mental Health (NIMH) training program in psychiatric genetics. During this time, Tsuang partnered with colleague Michael Lyons to conduct the Harvard Twin Study of Substance Abuse. The study followed 1,874 identical and 1,498 male twin pairs who served in the U.S. military between 1965 and 1975 and sought the effects of genetic, shared environmental and unique environmental factors on their illicit drug use. The study was the first to use the United States Department of Veterans Affairs Vietnam Era Twin Registry for research on illicit drug use. The results of the study suggested that genetics influence a shared vulnerability to illicit drug use and that the vulnerability varies by drug. In 2001, Tsuang and his cohort published their findings on the connection between the study's data and interviews of the participants: in participants with major depression, they found a comorbidity of illicit drug abuse and the occurrence of the drug use was higher in participants with the mood disorder than those without. This study preceded the 2012 publication of the Vietnam Era Twin Study of Aging (VESTA), which considered the behavior and genetics associated with cognitive and brain aging in randomly-selected males who participated in Tsuang's 1985 study.

Also during the 1980s, Tsuang began researching endophenotypes. His and his colleagues' research on the neuropsychological dysfunction of people with schizophrenia and their non-psychotic family members helped shift psychiatry's formerly accepted view that dysfunction was related to the disease. After multiple studies found that non-psychotic family members of people with schizophrenia showed similar mild cognitive deficits, the view that neuropsychological deficits are a central characteristic of schizophrenia became widely accepted. In 1989, Tsuang's continued his work in genetics by co-founding the NIMH Molecular Genetics Initiative and piloting the 1991 Diagnostic Interview for Genetic Studies (DIGS), which was designed to genetically assess major mood and psychotic disorders as well as their conditions. DIGS continues to serve as a benchmark assessment today.

Beginning in the 1990s, Tsuang's research on non-psychotic adults related to people with schizophrenia lead to studies focused on the psychosis prodrome to inform the early prevention and diagnosis of schizophrenia as well as interventions for the disorder. Through functional neuroimaging studies, Tsuang and his colleagues found that non-psychotic family members of people with schizophrenia showed brain activity deficits and determined that the abnormalities in the structure and function of the brain are endophenotypes for the disorder.

In 1999, in an effort to make progress toward the most effective primary prevention of schizophrenia, Tsuang and his colleagues published their discussion of schizotaxia, or liability to schizophrenia, because it is the antecedent of early symptoms of psychosis. The publication discusses the schizotaxia treatment protocol, or the evaluation of antipsychotics that may help prevent schizophrenia. The protocol, created by Tsuang, was met with controversy. However, the participants—non-psychotic family members of people with schizophrenia—volunteered for the open-label trial. In the first trial evaluation, the small sample of participants showed reduced negative symptoms and neuropsychological deficits after several weeks of risperidone use. After additional trials, the companion discussion published in 2000 was released to discuss the etiology and development of schizotaxia, review its clinical and neuropsychological aspects and conclude that it become validated as a syndrome of schizophrenia. Tsuang's cluster analysis of a larger sample of family members of people with schizophrenia proved its validity, which helped further progress toward preventing schizophrenia.

In 2003, Tsuang was appointed as University Professor at UC San Diego School of Medicine and director of the university's Center of Behavioral Genomics, which he established. At this time, his research involved identifying genetic risk factors and biomarkers in order to determine the neurobiology of severe mental disorders. In 2005, Tsuang and his colleagues published a discussion of their microarray analysis of the blood cells of RNA from participants with schizophrenia, with bipolar disorder and without either disorder. The results of the study showed unique gene expression patterns for all three groups of participants as well as changes in several specific biomarker genes for schizophrenia and bipolar disorder by RT-PCR. The study is considered innovative because Tsuang created a framework for biologically diagnosing major mental illness antemortem. Tsuang's work led to further use of the biomarker strategy for research on treatment response in schizophrenia, risk state for schizophrenia in first-degree family members of people with schizophrenia and susceptibility to other disorders. In 2006, Tsuang and his colleagues published research that furthered the understanding of genetic risk factors for schizophrenia through a collaborative study of a large sample of Han Chinese families from Taiwan related to people with schizophrenia. Although the results of the exome sequencing study were similar to those of similar preceding studies, Tsuang and his colleagues were unable to definitively identify susceptibility genes for schizophrenia. However, the study did help clarify the genetic structure of schizophrenia and supported the understanding of the significance of genetic variants on risk for the disorder. Tsuang continued to pursue the identification of genetic risk factors for schizophrenia in later research.

In 2014, Tsuang and his colleagues published a discussion of the Marine Resiliency Study, which involved identifying diagnostic biomarkers that predict the appearance of post-traumatic stress disorder (PTSD) in deployed U.S. Marines. The pilot study was conducted to inform earlier diagnosis and prevention of the disorder. The investigators conducted a microarray analysis of the blood cells of RNA from U.S. Marines before and after they had returned from deployment in Iran and Afghanistan war zones. The results of the study showed the feasibility of the validation of blood-based biomarkers and helped further efforts to prevent and buffer against the effects of PTSD.

== Awards ==
For his work as a Chair, Tsuang was awarded a Behavioral Genomics endowed chair by Harvard Medical School. In 1995, Tsuang received the ISPG Lifetime Achievement Award, which is named after him. Among other awards, he also received the 2010 Lieber Prize for Outstanding Achievement in Schizophrenia Research.
