= P. Michael Conneally =

American geneticist (1931–2017)

- Born: December 4, 1931
- Died: February 17, 2017 (aged 85)
- Occupation: Geneticist

P. Michael Conneally, Ph.D., (December 4, 1931 – February 17, 2017) was the Distinguished Professor Emeritus at the Indiana University School of Medicine in the Department of Medical and Molecular Genetics. He was certified in medical genetics by the American Board of Medical Genetics and a founding fellow of the American College of Medical Genetics. He was a human geneticist interested in discovering the location of human genes that cause disease, specifically the mapping of Mendelian and complex inherited diseases including the study of Huntington's disease, genetics of alcoholism, diabetes and manic depressive illness. In collaboration with researchers from Columbia University and James F. Gusella of Harvard University, he was the first to use DNA techniques to map a human gene. In the past twenty years he has helped map approximately 20 human genes and his work has resulted in the identification of 20% of the human genome. Conneally received his bachelor's degree in Agriculture with Honors from University College Dublin in 1954 and Master’s and Ph.D. from the University of Wisconsin, Madison.

Conneally’s research interests were in the mapping of Mendelian and complex inherited diseases including the study of Huntington's disease, genetics of alcoholism, diabetes and manic depressive illness.

== Biography ==
Conneally was born in Galway, Ireland on April 12, 1931. He attended University College Dublin on scholarship and graduated with a bachelor's degree in Agriculture with honors in 1954. Following graduation, he worked as an agriculture instructor in west of Ireland advising farmers. He decided to obtain a master's degree and was prompted to travel to the United States to obtain the degree by faculty in the Department of Agriculture at University College Dublin. Many of his aunts and uncles had migrated to the United States and settled in Chicago, Illinois, prompting him to choose a school close by. He went to the University of Wisconsin, Madison in 1958 and graduated with his Master's and Ph.D. in Medical Genetics in 1962 under direction of Newton Morton, an epidemiological geneticist, when James F. Crow was chairman of the Department of Medical Genetics. Conneally then spent two years at Case Western Reserve University in Cleveland with Arthur Steinberg and worked with Hutterites, a genetic isolate in the western United States and Canada. He then came to the Indiana University School of Medicine in 1964 where he was appointed Assistant Professor in the Department of Medicine on a tenure track. Approximately two years after arriving at Indiana, the Department of Medical and Molecular Genetics was created with Conneally as one of the first professors in the department under Don Merritt. Dr. Conneally died on February 17, 2017.

== Honors ==
He served as president of the American Society of Human Genetics, secretary general of the World Federation on Neurology’s Section on Huntington’s Disease and was a member of the World Trade Center and Hurricane Katrina DNA Identification Committees. He was the recipient of numerous honors, including the Milton Wexler Award and the Lifetime Achievement Award of the International Society of Psychiatric Genetics. He has authored or co-authored over 500 abstracts and publications and has served as the editor of five scientific journals. In 1989, he was awarded an honorary Doctor of Science honoris causa degree by Trinity College, Dublin, Ireland. In 1991, Conneally was selected as the Irwin Research Awardee, IUPUI’s highest recognition of faculty research accomplishments and in 2001 received the International Society of Psychiatric Genetics Lifetime Achievement Award.
