= Henri Begleiter =

American neuroscientist (1935–2006)

- Henri Begleiter
- Born: September 11, 1935; Nimes, France
- Died: April 6, 2006 (aged 70); Long Island, NY
- Known for: Alcoholism, Brain Wave, EEG topography
- Awards: Dan Anderson Research Award (2000)
- Scientific career
- Fields: Scientist, Neurophysiologist

Henri Begleiter (September 11, 1935 in Nimes, France – April 6, 2006 in Long Island, NY) was a neurophysiologist and Distinguished Professor of Psychiatry and Neuroscience at SUNY Downstate Medical Center in Brooklyn. He was a leader in the nascent field of biomedical alcohol research in the 1970s, postulating alcoholism as a brain disorder. He founded and headed the world-renowned Neurodynamics Laboratory at SUNY Downstate Medical Center, Brooklyn, which has been renamed in 2007 into the 'Henri Begleiter Neurodynamics Laboratory'.

The highlights of Begleiter’s career include the ground breaking finding published in Science that some neurophysiological anomalies in alcoholics were already present in their young offspring before any exposure to alcohol and drugs. These seminal findings led Henri to propose a model that changed the thinking in the field: namely, that rather than being a consequence of alcoholism, this underlying neural hyperexcitability was a predisposing factor leading to the development of alcoholism and related disorders. This innovative study was replicated throughout the world and launched him on a systematic search to elucidate the genetic vulnerability underlying a predisposition toward alcoholism and related disorders.

In 1990, with his foresight and charismatic leadership, Henri Begleiter was instrumental in assembling scientists in various domains to organize the large Collaborative Studies on Genetics of Alcoholism — COGA, which he has led since its inception. Under his leadership, with a strong emphasis on novel approaches such as using brain oscillations as endophenotypes, COGA has successfully identified several genes involved in the predisposition to develop alcoholism and related disorders, and this approach is still state-of-the-art today.

== Books ==
- The Biology of Alcoholism, edited by Kissin and Begleiter, Volumes 1-7. 1971-1983
- Alcohol and Alcoholism, edited by Begleiter and Kissin, Volumes 1-2. 1995-1996
- Evoked Brain Potentials and Behavior (The Downstate Series of Research in Psychiatry and Psychology, Volume 2), edited by Begleiter, 1979.
- Biological Effects of Alcohol, 1980.
