= Australian and New Zealand Journal of Psychiatry =

- Language: English
- Edited by: Gin S. Malhi

Publication details
- Publisher: SAGE Publications
- Frequency: Monthly
- Impact factor: 5.744 (2020)

Standard abbreviations
- ISO 4: Aust. N. Z. J. Psychiatry

Indexing
- ISSN: 0004-8674 (print); 1440-1614 (web)
- LCCN: 70012053
- OCLC no.: 605130312

Links
- Journal homepage; Current Issue; Online Archive of All Issues

Australian and New Zealand Journal of Psychiatry is a peer-reviewed academic journal that publishes papers in the field of psychiatry. The journal's editor is Professor Gin S. Malhi. It is currently published by SAGE Publications on behalf of the Royal Australian and New Zealand College of Psychiatrists.

== Scope ==
Australian and New Zealand Journal of Psychiatry aims to publish original articles which describe research or report opinions of interest to psychiatrists. The journal contains original research, reviews, descriptions of patients and letters to the editor. Australian and New Zealand Journal of Psychiatry also publishes editorial comments and book reviews.

== Abstracting and indexing ==
Australasian and New Zealand Journal of Psychiatry is led by Prof Gin Malhi. It is abstracted and indexed in, among other databases: SCOPUS, and the Social Sciences Citation Index. According to the Journal Citation Reports, its 2020 impact factor is 5.744, ranking it 19 out of 143 journals in the category 'Psychiatry'.
