= Janet Carter =

New Zealand psychotherapy academic

- Education: University of Otago
- Scientific career
- Fields: Clinical psychology
- Workplaces: University of Canterbury
- Thesis: Gender and depression: a clinical perspective (2002)

Janet Deborah Carter is a New Zealand clinical psychology academic who became a full professor and dean of science at the University of Canterbury in 2016. She was appointed acting Pro Vice Chancellor of Science for 2019–2020, and acting Executive Dean of Science from mid 2021.

== Academic career ==
Carter completed a master's degree at the University of Canterbury in 1996, with a thesis on gender differences in depression. After a PhD titled 'Gender and depression: a clinical perspective' at the University of Otago, Carter moved to the University of Canterbury, rising to full professor.

== Selected works ==
- Carter, J.D., Mulder, R.T., Bartram, A.F. and Darlow, B.A., 2005. Infants in a neonatal intensive care unit: parental response. Archives of Disease in Childhood-Fetal and neonatal edition, 90(2), pp.F109-F113.
- Kawa, Izabela, Janet D. Carter, Peter R. Joyce, Caroline J. Doughty, Chris M. Frampton, J. Elisabeth Wells, Anne ES Walsh, and Robin J. Olds. "Gender differences in bipolar disorder: age of onset, course, comorbidity, and symptom presentation." Bipolar disorders 7, no. 2 (2005): 119–125.
- Luty, Suzanne E., Janet D. Carter, Janice M. McKenzie, Alma M. Rae, Christopher MA Frampton, Roger T. Mulder, and Peter R. Joyce. "Randomised controlled trial of interpersonal psychotherapy and cognitive–behavioural therapy for depression." The British Journal of Psychiatry 190, no. 6 (2007): 496–502.
- Joyce, Peter R., Janice M. McKenzie, Janet D. Carter, Alma M. Rae, Suzanne E. Luty, Christopher MA Frampton, and Roger T. Mulder. "Temperament, character and personality disorders as predictors of response to interpersonal psychotherapy and cognitive-behavioural therapy for depression." The British Journal of Psychiatry 190, no. 6 (2007): 503–508.
- Joyce, Peter R., Janice M. McKenzie, Suzanne E. Luty, Roger T. Mulder, Janet D. Carter, Patrick F. Sullivan, and C. Robert Cloninger. "Temperament, childhood environment and psychopathology as risk factors for avoidant and borderline personality disorders." Australian & New Zealand Journal of Psychiatry 37, no. 6 (2003): 756–764.
