= Thrombotic storm =

Blood clots are a relatively common occurrence in the general population and are seen in approximately 1–2% of the population by age 60. Typically, blood clots develop in the deep veins of the lower extremities, deep vein thrombosis (DVT) or as a blood clot in the lung, pulmonary embolism. A very small number of people who develop blood clots have a more serious and often life-threatening condition, known as thrombotic storm (TS). TS is characterized by the development of more than one blood clot in a short period of time. These clots often occur in multiple and sometimes unusual locations in the body and are often difficult to treat. TS may be associated with an existing condition or situation that predisposes a person to blood clots, such as injury, infection, or pregnancy. In many cases, a risk assessment will identify interventions that will prevent the formation of blood clots.

While the mechanism or pathogenesis is not completely understood, mostly due to its rarity, the medical community has developed a new interest in learning more about this syndrome. Dr. Craig S. Kitchens first described TS in six case studies. In these cases, he described a collection of similar features observed in six patients, suggesting this may be accounted for by a new syndrome.

== Presentation ==
Thrombotic storm has been seen in individuals of all ages and races. The initial symptoms of TS present similarly to the symptoms experienced in deep vein thrombosis. Symptoms of a DVT may include pain, swelling and discoloration of the skin in the affected area. As with DVTs, patients with TS may subsequently develop pulmonary emboli. Although the presentation of TS and DVTs are similar, TS typically progresses rapidly, with numerous clots occurring within a short period of time. After the formation of the initial clot, a patient with TS typically begins a “clotting storm” with the development of multiple clots throughout the body. Rapid progression within a short period of time is often seen, affecting multiple organs systems. The location of the clot is often unusual or found in a spot in the body that is uncommon, such as the dural sinus. Patients tend to respond very well to anticoagulations such as Coumadin or low-molecular-weight heparin but may become symptomatic when treatment is withheld.

While the key clinical characteristics of thrombotic storm are still being investigated, it is believed that the clinical course is triggered by a preexisting condition, known as a hypercoagulable state. These can include such things as pregnancy, trauma or surgery. Hypercoagulable states can be an inherited or acquired risk factor that then serves as a trigger to initiate clot formation. However, in a subset of patient with TS a trigger cannot be identified. Typically, people with TS will have no personal or family history of coagulation disorders.

== Diagnosis ==
Currently, laboratory testing is not as reliable as observation when it comes to defining the parameters of thrombotic storm. Careful evaluation of possible thrombosis in other organ systems is pertinent in expediting treatment to prevent fatality. Preliminary diagnosis consists of evidence documented with proper imaging studies such as CT scan, MRI, or echocardiography, which demonstrate a thromboembolic occlusion in the veins and/or arteries. Vascular occlusions mentioned must include at least two of the clinic events:

- Deep venous thrombosis affecting one (or more) limbs and/or pulmonary embolism.
- Cerebral vein thrombosis.
- Portal vein thrombosis, hepatic vein, or other intra-abdominal thrombotic events.
- Jugular vein thrombosis in the absence of ipsilateral arm vein thrombosis and in the absence of ipsilateral central venous access.
- Peripheral arterial occlusions, in the absence of underlying atherosclerotic vascular disease, resulting in extremity ischemia and/or infarction.
- Myocardial infarction, in the absence of severe coronary artery disease.
- Stroke and/or transient ischemic attack, in the absence of severe atherosclerotic disease and at an age less than 60 years.
- Central retinal vein and/or central retinal arterial thrombosis.
- Small vessel thrombosis affecting one or more organs, systems, or tissue; must be documented by histopathology.

In addition to the previously noted vascular occlusions, development of different thromboembolic manifestations simultaneously or within one or two weeks must occur, and the patient must have an underlying inherited or acquired hypercoagulable state (other than antiphospholipid syndrome).

=== Hypercoagulable states ===
Congenital	Acquired
Protein C deficiency	Catastrophic antiphospholipid syndrome
Protein S deficiency	Autoimmune disorder i.e. APS
Factor V Leiden	Illness that causes or promote tissue necrosis
Prothrombin mutation	Malignancy
Antithrombin deficiency	Pregnancy
	Immobility
	Surgery
	Trauma
	Thrombocytopenic purpura

== Treatment ==
Treatment for thrombotic storm may include lifelong anticoagulation therapy and/or thrombolytic therapy, plasmapheresis, and corticosteroids. Studies have shown that when anticoagulant therapy is withheld, recurrence of thrombosis usually follows. International normalized ratio is closely monitored in the course of treatment.
