= Ironshore =

Insurance company

- Type: Incorporated
- Industry: Insurance
- Founded: 2006
- Founder: Robert Clements, John Clements
- Key people: Kevin Kelley

Ironshore Inc. provides broker-sourced specialty property and casualty insurance coverages for varying risks on a global basis through its platforms in Australia, Bermuda, Canada, Ireland, Singapore, the United States and the United Kingdom. On December 5, 2016, it was announced that Ironshore will be sold to Liberty Mutual in a $3 billion transaction.

== History ==
The company was founded in 2006, with more than $1 billion in equity, by Robert Clements and his son John Clements, two long-time insurance investors.

Ironshore named Kevin Kelley as CEO in December 2008. Kelley had been the longtime CEO of Lexington Insurance, which became the largest excess and surplus lines insurer in the world under his leadership. Shaun Kelly resigned as president and chief operating officer of Lexington and was appointed chief executive officer of U.S. Operations for Ironshore. During 2015, Ironshore acquired Dubai-based MGA, Visionary underwriting Agency Ltd, a Lloyd's Coverholders founded in 2010 by David Austin.

== Operations ==
The company's product lines include Aviation, Environmental, IronBuilt, IronHealth, IronPro, Marine Re, Personal Lines, Political Risk, Ironshore Programs, and U.S. Property and Specialty Casualty.

The Ironshore group of companies is rated A (Excellent) by A.M. Best with a Financial Size Category of XIV. Ironshore’s Pembroke Syndicate 4000 operates within Lloyd’s with a market rating of A (Excellent) from A.M. Best and A+ from both Standard and Poor’s and Fitch Group. A.M. Best announced in 2012 a revised rating outlook to "Positive" for Ironshore and its subsidiaries.
