= Journal of Affective Disorders =

- Discipline: Psychiatry
- Language: English
- Edited by: Cornelius Katona, Hagop Akiskal

Publication details
- History: 1979–present
- Publisher: Elsevier on behalf of the International Society for Affective Disorders
- Frequency: Biweekly
- Impact factor: 6.6 (2022)

Standard abbreviations
- ISO 4: J. Affect. Disord.

Indexing
- CODEN: JADID7
- ISSN: 0165-0327
- OCLC no.: 38911953

Links
- Journal homepage; Online archive

The Journal of Affective Disorders is a peer-reviewed medical journal covering research on all aspects of affective disorders. It is published by Elsevier and its editors-in-chief are P. Brambilla and J.C. Soares. It was established in 1979 and is the official journal of the International Society for Affective Disorders.

== Abstracting and indexing ==
The journal is abstracted and indexed in:

- BIOSIS Previews
- Current Contents/Life Sciences
- EMBASE
- MEDLINE
- PASCAL
- FRANCIS
- PsycINFO/Psychological Abstracts
- Scopus

According to the Journal Citation Reports, the journal has a 2022 impact factor of 6.6.
