= Wellcome Trust Case Control Consortium =

Human genetics research consortium

The Wellcome Trust Case Control Consortium (abbreviated WTCCC) is a collaboration between fifty research groups in the United Kingdom in the field of human genetics. Established in 2005, the WTCCC aims to conduct genome-wide association studies (GWASs) to shed light on the genetic architecture of common human diseases. The founding chairman of the consortium was University of Oxford statistician Peter Donnelly. The consortium was funded by £9 million from the Wellcome Trust. According to the consortium's website, it has identified "approximately 90" new susceptibility loci for common human diseases.

The consortium's initial goal was to conduct large GWASs for eight common human diseases: tuberculosis, coronary heart disease, type 1 diabetes, type 2 diabetes, rheumatoid arthritis, Crohn's disease and ulcerative colitis, bipolar disorder and hypertension. These GWASs included a total of 19,000 subjects, of whom 2,000 had one of the eight diseases and an additional 3,000 served as controls. The study participants were genotyped using Affymetrix's GeneChip Human Mapping 500K Array Set, and genotype calling was conducted with the Chiamo algorithm.

The results of the WTCCC's initial research were reported in Nature in 2007. The research identified 24 genetic association "signals" that were statistically significant at P < 5 × 10^{−7}. At the time, this was the largest study ever conducted of the genetics of human diseases. In announcing the study's findings at a London news conference, Donnelly said, "If you think of the genome as a very long road that you are trying to find your way along in the dark, previously we have only been able to turn lights on in a small number of places, but now we can turn on lights in a large number of places— in this case half a million lights". The 2007 Nature paper was later named "paper of the year" by the Lancet, and it led to the WTCCC being named "research leader of the year" by Scientific American.
