= Royal Australian and New Zealand College of Psychiatrists =

Professional body

The Royal Australian and New Zealand College of Psychiatrists
- RANZCP Coat of Arms
- Abbreviation: RANZCP
- Formation: 9 October 1946
- Legal status: Company Limited by Guarantee
- Purpose: Psychiatry
- Headquarters: Melbourne, Victoria
- Location: Australia, New Zealand
- Region served: Australia and New Zealand
- Members: 6000
- President: Dr Astha Tomar
- Remarks: https://www.ranzcp.org

The Royal Australian and New Zealand College of Psychiatrists (RANZCP) is the principal organisation representing the medical specialty of psychiatry in Australia and New Zealand and has responsibility for training, examining and awarding the qualification of Fellowship of the College (FRANZCP) to medical practitioners. The college was established on 9 October 1946, and received Royal patronage in 1977.

== About ==
There are currently more than 4000 Fellows of the College who account for approximately 85 per cent of all practising psychiatrists in Australia and over 50 per cent of psychiatrists in New Zealand.

The Royal Australian and New Zealand College of Psychiatrists is a formal grouping of medical specialists and trainees with the following core purposes:

- Conducts a training and examinations process for qualification as a consultant psychiatrist
- Administers a continuing professional development programme for practising professionals
- Holds an annual scientific congress and various sectional conferences throughout the year
- Supports continuing medical education activities at a regional level
- Publishes a range of journals, statements and other policy documents
- Liaises with government, allied professionals and community groups in the interests of psychiatrists, patients and the general community

The Royal Australian and New Zealand College of Psychiatrists's vision: "To enhance the mental health of our nations through leadership in high-quality psychiatric care".

== History ==
The Australasian Association of Psychiatrists was formed on 9 October 1946. In 1962, the association resolved to "take the necessary action forthwith to convert the association into a college". and the Australian and New Zealand College of Psychiatrists was officially incorporated in Sydney on 28 October 1963. The Australasian Association of Psychiatrists was officially dissolved at a special general meeting in Melbourne on 12 April 1964. The first formal meeting of the council of the new College took place in Canberra on 25 October 1964. The meeting coincided with the College’s first annual congress.

The RANZCP was granted the Royal prefix with effect from May 1978. An extraordinary meeting of the College ratified the inclusion of "Royal" in the College’s name on 7 May 1978.

== Governance ==
The RANZCP is governed by a board of democratically elected directors, led by the college president. The board governs according to the RANZCP Constitution.

The college comprises branches in each state and territory of Australia, and New Zealand. Its governance structure also includes faculties, sections and networks.

== RANZCP Publications ==
The RANZCP publishes:

- Two journals: the Australian and New Zealand Journal of Psychiatry and Australasian Psychiatry.
- Consumer and carer treatment guides for Australia and New Zealand.
- A variety of position statements, clinical memoranda and practice and ethical guidelines pertaining to the practice of psychiatry to inform practitioners and the general public of issues that may impact upon the practice of psychiatry across Australia and New Zealand.

== Training ==
The college undertakes a postgraduate Psychiatric Training Programme in Australia and New Zealand for obtaining a Fellowship of the college, which requires mandatory supervision by experienced, qualified psychiatrists and is undertaken in approved training hospitals/services. Training takes a minimum of five years to complete, during which time trainees work as registrars under supervision in hospitals and community clinics. They gain wide experience in dealing with the full range of psychiatric problems, including those of children and families, adults and the elderly.

== Arms ==
Coat of arms of the Royal Australian and New Zealand College of Psychiatrists

Notes
The search for a college coat of arms was led in 1962–1969 by Dr Eric Cunningham Dax, who sought the involvement of the College of Arms. The final design was made by the Bluemantle Pursuivant of Arms, John Brooke-Little. The college declined to grant supporters "owing to the recent foundation of the College".
Adopted
Granted by the Kings of Arms, 29 March 1966. Adopted by the college, 1969.
Helm
A closed Helmet, mantling Or doubled Azure.
Symbolism
Escutcheon: The crossed bands and central square within a circle is a reference to "an intellect that has become disordered and has turned its strength against itself and the body". The two Rod of Asclepius (a serpent wrapped around a staff) are an ancient Greek symbol of healing and medicine, but are also a reference to Carl Jung's theory of the wounded healer, and the serpent is also a reference to Ungud, the serpent of the Australian Aboriginal dreamtime. Crest: The Alchemical symbol for Alum was attributed special mental healing powers, and above this symbol is a Roman Cross. The combination of the two symbols was made as an allusion to the "exerting healing influence over the disordered intellect". Motto: In 1966–68, the college considered several motto suggestions, including Humanitate Progedi (‘Progress through Understanding’), but all were rejected by the College of Arms as not being good Latin. A suggestion from Dr John Cade – Non est viveresed valere vita (‘Not just to live but to value life’) – was agreed but later rejected after it was found to be the motto of the Royal Society of Medicine. The final suggestion of Ex Veritate Salus by Dr Donald Scott-Orr was adopted by the college council in October 1968.

== Notable Fellows (FRANZCP) ==
- David Ames
- Dame Marie Bashir
- John Cade (President, 1969–70)
- Eric Cunningham Dax (President, 1964–65)
- Lorraine Dennerstein
- John Diamond
- Sir Mason Durie
- Ian Hickie
- Christine Kilpatrick
- Felice Lieh-mak
- Patrick McGorry
- Ainslie Meares
- Christos Pantelis
- Gordon Parker
- Beverley Raphael
- Sarah Romans
- Patrick F. Sullivan
- Nan Waddy

== See also ==
- List of Australian organisations with royal patronage
- Royal College of Psychiatrists
- American Psychiatric Association
- Hong Kong College of Psychiatrists
