= Comprehensive Psychiatry =

- Discipline: Psychopathology
- Language: English
- Edited by: Naomi Fineberg

Publication details
- History: 1960-present
- Publisher: Elsevier
- Frequency: Bimonthly
- Impact factor: 4.8 (2025)

Standard abbreviations
- ISO 4: Compr. Psychiatry

Indexing
- CODEN: COPYAV
- ISSN: 0010-440X (print); 1532-8384 (web)
- LCCN: 63024090
- OCLC no.: 01564585

Links
- Journal homepage; Online access; Online archive

Comprehensive Psychiatry is a bimonthly peer-reviewed medical journal covering psychopathology. It was established in 1960 and is published by Elsevier. The editor-in-chief is Naomi Fineberg (University of Hertfordshire). According to the Journal Citation Reports, the journal has a 2017 impact factor of 2.128.
