= Theodore Reich =

Canadian-American professor of psychiatry and genetics

- Born: October 14, 1938; Montreal, Quebec
- Died: December 25, 2003 (aged 65); St. Louis, Missouri, U.S
- Citizenship: United States
- Education: McGill University
- Scientific career
- Fields: Psychiatric genetics
- Workplaces: Washington University in St. Louis

Theodore Reich (October 14, 1938 – December 25, 2003) was a Canadian-American professor of psychiatry and genetics at the Washington University School of Medicine. Reich is considered one of the founders of modern psychiatric genetics and mostly studied the genetic aspects of mental illness.

He was a founder and president of the International Society of Psychiatric Genetics and received the organisation's Lifetime Achievement Award in 1999.

Reich earned a bachelor's degree in honors physiology in 1959 and completed a medical degree at McGill in 1963.
