= Michael Owen (psychiatrist) =

British psychiatrist

Professor Sir Michael Owen
- Education: Birmingham University,
- Occupation: Psychiatrist

Sir Michael John Owen FRCPsych FMedSci FLSW is a Welsh research scientist in the area of psychiatry, currently the head of the Division of Psychological Medicine and Clinical Neurosciences at Cardiff University.

Professor Owen is also the Director of Cardiff University's MRC Centre for Neuropsychiatric Genetics and Genomics and Emeritus Director of the Neuroscience and Mental Health Research Institute.

== Career ==
Owen studied medicine and neurosciences at Birmingham University, gaining a B.Sc. in anatomy in 1977 and a PhD in neuroscience in 1982, and qualifying MB ChB in 1983. He then trained in Psychiatry at Northwick Park and the Maudsley Hospital, London, obtaining his MRCPsych in 1987.

He then undertook an MRC Fellowship in John Hardy's lab at St Mary's Hospital, London before moving to Cardiff in 1990. He was awarded a personal chair in 1995 and the chair in Psychological Medicine and Headship of the Department of Psychological Medicine in 1998.

His research has focused on the genetics of major psychiatric and neurodegenerative disorders and he has made notable contributions to the study of schizophrenia and Alzheimer disease. He has studied the impact of genetic risk factors across diagnostic boundaries and developed a theoretical framework to understand the relationship between different neurodevelopmental disorders. He has also identified specific genes and sets of proteins involved in the pathogenesis of schizophrenia and Alzheimer's disease, which are potential therapeutic targets.

As well as continuing his work on psychiatric genetics, he is currently undertaking research aimed at translating recent genetic findings into a greater understanding of disease mechanisms and into the development of novel biomarkers to aid classification and diagnosis.

== Awards ==
In recognition of his achievements Professor Owen was elected to Fellowship of the Royal College of Psychiatrists in 1997, the Fellowship of the Academy of Medical Sciences in 1999 and the Fellowship of the Learned Society of Wales in 2012.

In 2011, he was awarded the Stromgren Medal for psychiatric research, in 2012 the Lieber Prize jointly with Professor Michael O'Donovan for schizophrenia research, and in 2013 the William K Warren Distinguished Investigator Award for schizophrenia research.

He was also awarded the Lifetime Achievement Award of the International Society of Psychiatric Genetics in 2015, and the British Neuroscience Association Award for Outstanding Contribution to Neuroscience in 2017.

Professor Owen was knighted in the 2014 Birthday Honours for services to neuroscience and mental health.
