= Brain & Behavior Research Foundation =

US non-profit organization

- Abbreviation: BBRF
- Formation: 1987; 39 years ago
- Headquarters: 747 3rd Avenue, 33rd Floor, New York City
- Fields: Neurology, Psychiatry
- Website: bbrfoundation.org
- Formerly called: National Alliance for Research on Schizophrenia & Depression

The Brain & Behavior Research Foundation (BBRF) is a nonprofit 501(c)(3) organization that funds mental health research. It was originally called the National Alliance for Research on Schizophrenia & Depression, or NARSAD. It received its nonprofit ruling in 1981.

== Mission and work ==
BBRF states that it is "committed to alleviating the suffering caused by mental illness by awarding grants that will lead to advances and breakthroughs in scientific research." The Foundation focuses its research grants in the following areas: addiction, ADHD, anxiety, autism, bipolar disorder, borderline personality disorder, depression, eating disorders, OCD, PTSD, and schizophrenia. Grant applications (943 in 2019), are assessed by the BBRF Scientific Council. This is a group of 187 prominent mental health researchers, led by Herbert Pardes, M.D., who review each grant application and select those deemed most likely to lead to breakthroughs. A total of 150 Young Investigator grants were made in 2022.

== Research funding awarded ==
From its inception in 1987 through calendar year 2022, BBRF has awarded over $440 million to fund more than 6,400 grants to more than 5,300 scientists around the world. The Foundation states that 100% of every dollar donated for research goes towards research. BBRF is able to achieve this thanks to the support of two family foundations that fully cover its operating expenses.

== Awards ==
BBRF has two main prizes: the Klerman and Freedman Prizes, which are to recognize exceptional clinical or basic research into mental illness. They are awarded annually.
