= Psychiatric Genomics Consortium =

Consortium of psychiatric genomic researchers

The Psychiatric Genomics Consortium (PGC) is an international consortium of scientists dedicated to conducting meta- and mega-analyses of genomic-wide genetic data, with a focus on psychiatric disorders. It is the largest psychiatric consortium ever created, including over 800 researchers from 38 countries as of 2019. Its goal is to generate information about the genetics of psychiatric conditions that will be "actionable", that is, "genetic findings whose biological implications can be used to improve diagnosis, develop rational therapeutics, and craft mechanistic approaches to primary prevention". The consortium makes the main findings from its research freely available for use by other researchers.

== History ==
The PGC was founded in early 2007, originally as the Psychiatric Genome Wide Association Consortium. One of its founders was Patrick F. Sullivan (UNC School of Medicine), who now serves as its lead principal investigator. It was initially a branch of the Genetic Association Information Network, a public-private partnership aimed at researching the genetics of human disorders in general.

For its first four years of existence, the PGC focused on autism spectrum disorder, attention-deficit hyperactivity disorder, bipolar disorder, major depressive disorder, and schizophrenia. It also initially focused only on finding common single nucleotide polymorphisms that were associated with psychiatric disorders. Since then, it has expanded its scope to include other disorders, as well as less common forms of genetic variation such as copy number variation.

== Findings ==
Research from the PGC has shed light on the genetic architecture of psychiatric disorders generally, as well as demonstrating the viability of the genome-wide association approach for specific disorders such as schizophrenia and bipolar disorder. The consortium has also identified 108 genetic loci that are consistently associated with schizophrenia. In addition, its findings have pointed to significant pleiotropy across psychiatric disorders, with many common alleles influencing the risk of multiple such disorders.
