= Psychiatric genetics =

Research field focused on role of genetics in development of mental disorders

Psychiatric genetics is a subfield of behavioral neurogenetics and behavioral genetics which studies the role of genetics in the development of mental disorders (such as alcoholism, schizophrenia, bipolar disorder, and autism). The basic principle behind psychiatric genetics is that genetic polymorphisms (as indicated by linkage to e.g. a single nucleotide polymorphism) are part of the causation of psychiatric disorders.

Psychiatric genetics is a somewhat new name for the old question, "Are behavioral and psychological conditions and deviations inherited?". The goal of psychiatric genetics is to better understand the causes of psychiatric disorders, to use that knowledge to improve treatment methods, and possibly also to develop personalized treatments based on genetic profiles (see pharmacogenomics). In other words, the goal is to transform parts of psychiatry into a neuroscience-based discipline.

Recent advances in molecular biology allowed for the identification of hundreds of common and rare genetic variations that contribute to psychiatric disorders.

Psychiatric genetics has established that most psychiatric disorders, such as schizophrenia and autism, are highly heritable and polygenic, meaning they are influenced by thousands of common genetic variants, each having a small effect on risk.

== History ==
Research on psychiatric genetics began in the late nineteenth century with Francis Galton (a founder of psychiatric genetics) who was motivated by the work of Charles Darwin and his concept of desegregation. These methods of study later improved due to the development of more advanced clinical, epidemiological, and biometrical research tools. Better research tools were the precursor to the ability to perform valid family, twin, and adoption studies. Researchers learned that genes influence how these disorders manifest and that they tend to aggregate in families. Major recent progress in psychiatric genetics has been made possible by the advent of the 'genome-wide association study', a case-control design that compares genetic variants in very large groups of individuals with and without a diagnosis, and through large, global collaborative efforts including the wellcome trust case control consortium and psychiatric genomics consortium, among many others.

== Heritability and genetics ==
Most psychiatric disorders are highly heritable; the estimated heritability for bipolar disorder, schizophrenia, and autism (80% or higher) is much higher than that of diseases like breast cancer and Parkinson's disease. Having a close family member affected by a mental illness is the largest known risk factor, to date. However, linkage analysis and genome-wide association studies have found few reproducible risk factors.

Heterogeneity is an important factor to consider when dealing with genetics. Two types of heterogeneity have been identified in association with psychiatric genetics: causal and clinical. Causal heterogeneity refers to a situation in which two or more causes can independently induce the same clinical syndrome. Clinical heterogeneity refers to when a single cause can lead to more than one clinical syndrome.

Several genetic risk factors have been found with the endophenotypes of psychiatric disorders, rather than with the diagnoses themselves. That is, the risk factors are associated with particular symptoms, not with the overall diagnosis. In psychiatry, endophenotypes are a way of objectively measuring certain internal processes in a reliable way that is often lacking the diseases with which they are associated. They lie in the space between genes and disease process and allow for some understanding of the biology of psychiatric diseases.

A systematic comparative analysis of shared and unique genetic factors highlighted key gene sets and molecular processes underlying six major neuropsychiatric disorders: attention deficit hyperactivity disorder, anxiety disorders, autistic spectrum disorders, bipolar disorder, major depressive disorder, and schizophrenia. This may ultimately translate into improved diagnosis and treatment of these debilitating disorders.

== Methodology ==
Linkage, association, and microarray studies generate raw material for findings in psychiatric genetics. Copy number variants have also been associated with psychiatric conditions.

Genetic Linkage studies attempt to find a correlation between the diagnosis and inheritance of certain alleles within families who have two or more ill relatives. An analysis of a linkage study uses a wide chromosomal region, whereas a genetic association study endeavors to identify a specific DNA polymorphism, which can be a deletion, inversion, or repletion of a sequence. Case-control association studies can be used as an exploratory tool for narrowing the area of interest after preliminary mapping of a gene by a linkage study.

Genome-Wide Association Studies uncover genetic links in psychiatric disorders by analyzing the genomes of large groups of individuals, comparing genetic variants between individuals with a disorder and individuals without to identify regions associated with increased risk.

== Predictive genetic testing ==
One hope for future genetic testing is the ability to test for presymptomatic or prenatal illnesses. This information has the potential to improve the lives of those affected with certain illnesses, specifically those like schizophrenia. If possible to test for schizophrenia before the symptoms develop, proactive interventions could be developed, or even preventative treatments. In one study, 100% of patients with bipolar disorder indicated that they would probably take a genetic test to determine they were carrying a gene associated with the disorder, if such a test existed.

== Ethical issues ==
Francis Galton studied both desirable and undesirable behavioral and mental properties to better examine the world of genetics. His research led to his proposal of a eugenic program of birth control. His goal was to decrease the frequency of the less desirable traits that occurred throughout the population. His ideas were pursued by psychiatrists in many countries such as the United States, Germany and Scandinavia.

Genotyping and its implications are still seen as ethically controversial by many people. The ELSI (Ethical, Legal, and Social Initiative), which is part of the Human Genome Project, was created with the aim of "foster[ing] basic and applied research on the ethical, legal and social implications of genetic and genomic research for individuals, families and communities.".

== Psychiatric Genetic Disorders ==
For many years, it was known and accepted that there were genetic linkages between psychiatric disorders and a person’s predisposition to the disorder, but only in the past few years has there really been an effort made to identify any specific genes or markers leading to disorders such as schizophrenia, ASD, bipolar disorder, and anxiety disorders. In a recent analysis, a group studied the genetic architecture of these mental illnesses at several levels of analysis. The method of analysis in this case was genomic structural equation modeling on genome-wide association studies (GWAS). GWAS is a genetic tool that scans the entire DNA to identify pieces of the DNA associated with certain diseases or syndromes. With this data, scientists were able to sort 11 disorders into clustered groups and establish a covariance structure. They identified four correlational groups, sorting the different disorders into genetically similar sections that best fit the data.

- Factor 1 (or Group 1) consisted of obsessive–compulsive spectrum disorders: anorexia nervosa and OCD.
- Factor 2 involved disorders with psychotic features: schizophrenia and bipolar disorder.
- Factor 3 included neurodevelopmental disorders: ADHD and autism.
- Factor 4 contained internalizing disorders: anxiety and major depressive disorder.

Based on various data collection, correlational studies, and computing, the groups ultimately found varying numbers of independent loci for each factor, noting 154 total hits. Independent loci are specific locations, or markers, in chromosomes that are inherited independently of each other. Eighty-nine of these independent loci were found in correlation with the psychotic disorders, highlighting 12 new loci. The internalizing disorders had 29 genome-wide significant loci identified, while the neurodevelopmental group had 8, and the compulsive disorder factor only had one major hit. Additionally, two specific markers were found: SNP rs9314056 (seen in the internalizing factor as a hit for MDD and anxiety) and the ADH1B gene (rs4699743, seen in all four factors, although it was linked specifically with the idea that alcohol use may causally influence psychiatric risk.

In another study, which was more interested in the identification of therapeutic treatments of mental disorders, they detailed shared pathways and genetic factors involved in overlapping and similar illnesses. While expanding on the shared pathways between neurological and mental diseases, the article introduced the idea of genetic pleiotropy, where a single gene “affects numerous phenotypic features that may appear unrelated.” One example of this is theCACNA1C gene, which has been discovered to be a risk factor for bipolar disorder, as well as migraines and epilepsy.

An article from World Psychiatry gives a solid overview of biomarkers for many of the previously mentioned mental disorders. It begins with autism spectrum disorder, which, as of 2023, has the most genes identified as markers of any other DSM diagnosis. The article cited another study from Jakob Grove, a professor in the Department of Biomedicine at Aarhus University, and his team, for several identified loci of autism spectrum disorder, including the NEGR1, PTBP2, CADPS, KCNN2, KMT2E, and MACROD2 genes. Anxiety disorders were discussed next, highlighting the COMT (rs4680, G [val] allele), NPSR1 (rs324981, T allele), TPH1 (rs1800532, AA genotype), HTR2A (rs6313, T allele), and MAOA (uVNTR, long alleles) genes to be involved through their own gene study. Along with this, GWAS was used to note the several SNPs within the ESR1, GLRB, MYH15, NTRK2, PDE4B, RBFOX1, SATB1, TMEM132D, and TMEM106B genes, which are linked to anxiety disorders and anxiety-related traits. SNPs refer to single-nucleotide polymorphisms, which is when a single base in the DNA is changed. Finally, the article by World Psychiatry touched on the presence of the genetic markers behind mood disorders, stating that GWAS found 17 new loci for those disorders that fall in line with previously done secondary post-mortem studies.

These studies are constantly evolving, aiming to connect mental disorders with subsequent affecting genes in an effort to better understand underlying causes, early risk determinants, and possible courses of treatment. While not every aspect is understood yet, and not all markers have been identified, genetic psychiatry has made leaps and bounds from where it was even 10 years ago and continues to work towards not only the identification of these markers but potentially being able to alter them.

== See also ==
- Behavioural Genetics
- Neurogenetics
- International Behavioural and Neural Genetics Society (IBANGS)
- Gene-environment correlation
- Genetic predisposition
- Psychiatric Genetics (journal)
- Genes, Brain and Behavior (journal)
