= List of psychiatrists =

This is a list of notable psychiatrists.

Additional lists of psychiatrists can be found in the articles Fictional psychiatrists and List of physicians.

Medical doctors who are psychiatrists appear in those lists and are also included below. Some psychiatrists also in the list of neurologists and the list of neuroscientists.

Name		Nationality	Notes
Nise da Silveira	1905–1999	Brazilian	Psychiatrist and a student of Carl Jung. She devoted her life to psychiatry and has never been in agreement with the aggressive forms of treatment of her time such as commitment to psychiatric hospitals
Alfred Adler	1870–1937	Austrian	Individual psychology
Jill Afrin	1962–	American	Telepsychiatrist for deaf people
Leo Alexander	1905–1985	Austrian–American	Author
Alois Alzheimer	1864–1915	German	Alzheimer's disease
Daniel Amen	1954–	American	Psychiatrist and brain-disorder specialist
Nancy C. Andreasen	1938–	American	2000 National Medal of Science recipient, professor of psychiatry at the University of Iowa College of Medicine
Giorgio Antonucci	1933–2017	Italian	Critic of the basis of psychiatry
David Ames	1954–	Australian	2018 Order of Australia recipient for research in dementia and the mental health of older persons
Susan Bailey	1950–	British	President of the Royal College of Psychiatrists
Jack Barchas	1935–	American	Chairman of the Department of Psychiatry, Weill Cornell Medical College
Franco Basaglia	1924–1980	Italian	Mental health reformer
William Battie	1703–1776	British	Published in 1758 a book on the treatment of mental illness
Peter Baumann	1935–2011	Swiss	Advocate for psycholytic therapy and euthanasia
Aaron T. Beck	1921–2021	American	Father of cognitive therapy
Stephen Joseph Bergman, aka Samuel Shem	1944–	American	Author
Vladimir Bekhterev	1857–1927	Russian	Best known for noting the role of the hippocampus in memory, his study of reflexes, and Bekhterev's disease
Eugen Bleuler	1857–1940	Swiss	Coined terms "Autism" and "schizophrenia"
Manfred Bleuler	1903–1994	Swiss	Son of Eugen Bleuler, research on the course of chronic schizophrenia
William Breitbart	1951–	American	Chief of Psychiatry Service, Memorial Sloan-Kettering Cancer Center
John Charles Bucknill	1817–1897	British	mental health reformer
Aggrey Burke	1943–2025	British	transcultural psychiatry
Donald Ewen Cameron	1901–1967	Scottish	"Depatterning" and "psychic driving" CIA funded experiments, head of APA and WPA
John Cade	1912–1980	Australian	Lithium therapy research
Fiona Caldicott	1941–2021	British	
Mary Cannon	1965–	Irish	Psychiatrist and research scientist
Patricia Casey		Irish	Professor of Psychiatry at University College Dublin
Daniel Harold Casriel	1924–1983	American	Creator of 'The New Identity Process' (now called Bonding Psychotherapy)
Ferdinando Cazzamalli	1887–1958	Italian	Interested in paranormal and metaphysics
Anthony Clare	1942–2007	Irish	Academic, interviewer on radio and TV
John Gordon Clark	1926–1999	American	1991 psychiatrist of the year, Psychiatric Times
Ugo Cerletti	1877–1963	Italian	Neurologist, specialised in neuropsychiatry and electroconvulsive therapy
Eustace Chesser	1902–1973	Scottish	
John Conolly	1794–1866	British	He published the volume Indications of Insanity in 1830
Arnold Cooper	1923–2011	American	Psychoanalyst theorist, former Tobin-Cooper professor at Weill Cornell Medical College and president of the American Psychoanalytic Association
Michel Craplet		French	alcoholism specialist
James Crichton-Browne	1840–1938	British	A pioneer of British psychiatric public health
John Cutting	1952–	British	Also writer, specialising in schizophrenia
Dolly Dastoor	1969–	Canadian and Indian	Expert in geriatric psychiatry, particularly dementia assessment and care
Eric Cunningham Dax	1908–2008	British	Specialised in shock therapy and lobotomy
Christine Dean	1939–	British	British community, alternatives to psychiatric hospital treatment and human rights of people with mental health problems
Honorio Delgado	1892– 1969	Peruvian	Pioneered biological innovations in the treatment of psychiatric disorders, as well as the founder and first rector of Cayetano Heredia University.
Karl Deisseroth	1971–	American	Neuroscientist. Known for the technologies of CLARITY and optogenetics
John Langdon Down	1828–1896	British	Known for his description of Down syndrome and as a pioneer in the care of mentally disabled patients
Mason Durie	1938–	New Zealander	
Leon Eisenberg	1922–2009	American	Medical educator, first RCT in clinical child psychopharmacology, protégé of Leo Kanner, author of early articles about autism and neurodevelopmental disorders
Henri Ellenberger	1905-1993	Canadian	Psychiatrist, medical historian, criminologist
Milton H. Erickson	1901–1980	American	Founding president, American Society for Clinical Hypnosis
Gail Eskes	1955–	Canadian-American	academic psychiatrist
José María Esquerdo	1842–1912	Spanish	Spanish psychiatrist, physician, and Republican politician
Wayne Fenton	1953–2006	American	National Institute of Mental Health, ex-Chestnut Lodge
Ronald R. Fieve	1930-2018	American	Author of Moodswing, Bipolar II, Prozac, and Bipolar Breakthrough
Eleanora Fleury	1860–1940	Irish	First female member of the Medico Psychological Association (now the Royal College of Psychiatrists)
Viktor Frankl	1905–1997	Austrian	Neurologist, psychiatrist, psychologist, founder of logotherapy (The Third Viennese School of Psychotherapy)
Daniel X. Freedman	1921–1993	American	Pioneer in biological psychiatry
Walter Freeman	1895–1972	American	Proponent of Lobotomy
Sigmund Freud	1856–1939	Austrian	Neurologist, "the father of psychoanalysis"
Jacob H. Friedman	1905–1973	American	Pioneer in geriatric psychiatry
Karl J. Friston	1959–	British	Neuroscientist and authority on quantitative brain imaging
Pyotr Borisovich Gannushkin	1875–1933	Russian	Author of Manifestations of Psychopathies and Notes on the Psychiatric Clinic on Devichye Pole
S. Nassir Ghaemi	1966-	American	Academic psychiatrist, author of A First-Rate Madness and Clinical Psychopharmacology
Lars Christopher Gillberg	1950–	Swedish	Researched on ADHD and autism
Lili Hajdú Gimesné	1891–1960	Hungarian	President of the Hungarian Psychoanalytic Association and director of the National Institute of Psychiatry and Neurology
William Glasser	1925–2013	American	Reality Therapy and Choice Theory
Ira Glick		American	Professor Emeritus of Psychiatry and Behavioral Sciences at Stanford Medical School
Semyon Gluzman	1946–	Ukrainian	Whistle blower on political abuse of psychiatry in the Soviet Union
Frederick K. Goodwin	1936-2020	American	Director of the National Institute of Mental Health, author of Manic-Depressive Illness
Richard Green	1938–2019	American	Influential work done in studying gender identity
Mikhail Gurevich	1878–1953	Ukrainian, Soviet	Pioneer of Soviet child psychiatry
Samuel Guze	1888–1971	American	Jungian psychoanalyst
Mary Esther Harding	1923–2000	American	Medical educator, and researcher
Robert Galbraith Heath	1915–1999	American	Also neurologist
Edward M. Hallowell	1949–	American	Author of notable works on ADHD
Karen Horney	1885–1952	German	neo-Freudian
Henry Mills Hurd	1843–1927	American	The first director of the Johns Hopkins Hospital
Richard Isay	1934–2012	American	Psychoanalyst
Junichiro Ito	1954–	Japanese	Director of the Department of Psychiatric Rehabilitation, National Institute of Mental Health, Japan
Iliyan Ivanov	1963–	American Bulgarian	Professor of psychiatry at the Icahn School of Medicine in New York.
Karl Jaspers	1883–1969	German	Existential philosopher and psychopathologist
Eve Johnstone	1944–	British	Head of Division of Psychiatry, University of Edinburgh
Ayana Jordan		American	Addiction psychiatrist
Carl Jung	1875–1961	Swiss	Founder of analytical psychology
Karla Jurvetson	1965–	American	
Eric Richard Kandel	1929–	American	2000 Nobel Prize in Physiology or Medicine
Victor Khrisanfovich Kandinsky	1849–1889	Russian	Introduced the notion of pseudohallucinations and described the syndrome now known as Kandinsky-Clérambault syndrome
Boris Dmitrievich Karvasarsky	1929–2013	Russian	Author o Neuroses: Textbook for Doctors and Personality-Oriented Psychotherapy
Robert Evan Kendell	1935–2002	British	Nosology
Otto Kernberg	1928–	Austrian	Psychoanalytic theoretician and clinician
Seymour S. Kety	1915–2000	American	Psychiatric genetics
Alexander Khodjaev	1980–	Belarusian	Minister of Health
Sergei Sergeievich Korsakoff	1854–1900	Russian	Studied alcoholic psychosis, introduced the concept of paranoia and wrote a comprehensive textbook on psychiatry
Anatoly Koryagin	1938–	Russian	Whistle blower on punitive psychiatry in the Soviet Union
Emil Kraepelin	1856–1926	German	Founder of modern scientific psychiatry
Charles Krauthammer	1950–2018	American	Pulitzer-winning columnist, known for political commentary
Ernst Kretschmer	1888–1964	German	Researched the human constitution and established a typology
David Kupfer	1941–	American	University of Pittsburgh, current head of DSM-5
Arnold Kutzinski	1879–1956	German	Psychiatrist and neurologist, outspoken critic of psychoanalysis
Ronald David Laing	1927–1989	Scottish	Psychiatrist and antipsychiatrist
Mark Lawrence	1939–2011	American	Psychiatrist, CIA profiler and murder victim, subject of debate about the safety of mental health professionals when dealing with complex cases
Karl Leonhard	1904–1988	German	Described cycloid psychoses
Saul V. Levine	1938–	Canadian	author of Radical Departures: Desperate Detours to Growing Up
Aubrey Lewis	1900–1975	Australian	Clinical Director of the Maudsley Hospital, pivoltal influence on British psychiatry
Andrey Yevgenyevich Lichko	1926–1996	Russian	vice principal of Saint-Petersburg Psychoneurological Institute n.a. V.M. Bekhterev, author, Adolescent Psychiatry, Psychopathy and Accentuations of Character at Teenagers, and Schizophrenia in Teenagers.
Robert Jay Lifton	1926–2025	American	Author of Thought Reform
Manuel Isaías López	1941–2017	Mexican	Bioethics
Abraham Low	1891–1954	American	Founder of Recovery International (formerly Recovery, Inc.)
Herman Wedel Major	1814–1854	Norwegian	Father of Norwegian psychiatry
Henry Maudsley	1835–1918	British	A pioneer of British psychiatry
Thomas McGlashan	1942–	American	Professor of Psychiatry at Yale Medical School
Peter McGuffin	1949–2024	British	Psychiatric genetics
Friedrich Meggendorfer	1880–1953	German	Also neurologist, early describer of familial Creutzfeldt–Jakob disease.
Adolf Meyer	1866–1950	Swiss	"Common Sense" psychiatry
Theodor Meynert	1833–1892	German-Austrian	Founder of cerebral cortex cytoarchitectonics
Robert Michels	1876–1936	American	University Professor and former Dean, Weill Cornell Medical College
Patrick McGorry	1952–	Australian	developed early psychosis model
John Monro	1716–1791	British	Was the first of the Monro family of physicians dedicated to insanity
Juliano Moreira	1872–1933	Brazilian	Pioneer of psychoanalysis in Brazil
Robin Murray	1944–	British	Psychosis
Conolly Norman	1886–1908	Irish	R.M.S. of the Richmond District Lunatic Asylum, Dublin, Ireland
Ahmed Okasha	1935–	Egyptian	President of World Psychiatric Association from 2002 to 2005
Humphry Osmond	1917–2004	British	known for inventing the term "psychedelic"
Joy Osofsky		American	Professor of Clinical Psychology and Psychiatry at Louisiana State University School of Medicine
Ian Oswald	1929–2012	British	sleep research
Stanley Palombo		American	Psychiatrist and psychoanalyst, author
Herb Pardes	1934–2024	American	Psychiatry chair and dean at Columbia University, and president, New York Presbyterian Hospital
Gordon Parker		Australian	Mood disorders, in particular melancholia
Diana Perkins		American	Schizophrenia researcher
Nossrat Peseschkian	1933–2010	Iranian-German	Psychiatrist, neurologist, psychotherapist, founder of Positive Psychotherapy
Issy Pilowsky	1935–2012	Australian	abnormal illness behaviour
Philippe Pinel	1745–1826	French	Unchained hospital patients
M. Scott Peck	1936–2005	American	love and spiritual growth
Desmond Arthur Pond	1919–1986	British	Chief Scientist at Department of Health and Social Security
Antoine Porot	1876–1965	French	Algiers School of psychiatry
James B. Potash		American	Psychiatrist, researcher, and academic leader
Mark Ragins		American	American psychiatrist in the recovery movement, founding member of the Village ISA.
John Rawlings Rees	1890–1969	British	Military psychiatry and mind control
W. H. R. Rivers	1864–1922	British	Psychiatric anthropology
Hermann Rorschach	1884–1922	Swiss	also psychoanalyst, Rorschach inkblot test
Benjamin Rush	1746–1813	American	Father of American psychiatry
Gerald Russell	1928–2018	British	
Michael Rutter	1933–2021	British	Child psychiatry
Manfred Sakel	1900–1957	Austrian	Inventor of insulin shock therapy
William Sargant	1907–1988	British	Physical methods of treatment
Alan Schatzberg		American	Researches the biology and treatment of depression
Daniel Schechter	1962–	American	Researches effects of maternal post-traumatic stress on the mother-child relationship
Kurt Schneider	1887–1967	German	Schizophrenia research
Mogens Schou	1918-2005	Danish	Scientific research of lithium
Vladimir Petrovich Serbsky	1858–1917	Russian	Author of The Forensic Psychopathology
Martin Seligman	1942–	American	Learned helplessness
David Shaffer	1936–2023	South African	Child and adolescent psychiatrist, suicide researcher, epidemiologist
Michael Sharpe		British	Psychiatric aspects of medical illness
Michael Shepherd	1923–1995	British	Epidemiological Psychiatry
Jorge Alberto Costa e Silva	1942–	Brazilian	Former president of the World Psychiatric Association
Eliot Slater	1904–1983	British	Debunked "hysteria"
Victor Skumin	1948–	Russian	Skumin syndrome, also psychologist
Andrei Vladimirovich Snezhnevsky	1904–1987	Russian	introduced the term of sluggishly progressing schizophrenia
Solomon Halbert Snyder	1938–	American	neurotransmitters
Robert Spitzer	1932–2015	American	chair, Diagnostic and Statistical Manual of Mental Disorders (DSM–III), 1980
Hans Steiner	1946–2022	Austrian	leading advocate of the developmental psychopathology and psychiatry
Daniel Stern	1934–2012	American	Leading infant observation and parenting researcher, theorist, author
Tina Strobos	1920–2012	Dutch	Family psychiatrist, awarded Elizabeth Blackwell Medal, known for her work rescuing over 100 Jewish refugees during World War II
Kerry Sulkowicz	1958–	American	Psychology of corporate management
Cedric Howell Swanton	1899–1970	Australian	Electroconvulsive therapy
Thomas Szasz	1920–2012	American	Critic of conventional psychiatry
Susan Shur-Fen Gau	1962–	Taiwanese	Child and adolescent psychiatry
Içami Tiba	1941–2015	Brazilian	
Jared Tinklenberg	1939–2020	American	Alzheimer's disease
Giulio Tononi	1960–	Italian	Sleep research, integrated information theory, consciousness
Daniel Hack Tuke	1827–1895	British	Descended from the Tuke family of the York Retreat, co-author with John Charles Bucknill of the Manual of Psychological Medicine, editor of the Dictionary of Psychological Medicine, editor of the Journal of Mental Science.
E. Fuller Torrey	1937–	American	schizophrenia
Gordon Turnbull		Scottish	posttraumatic stress disorder
Jacqueline Verdeau-Paillès	1924–2010	French	music therapy for psychiatric patients
Vamık Volkan	1932–	Turkish-Cypriot	political psychiatry
Estela V. Welldon		Argentine	British Forensic Psychotherapist; founder, International Association of Forensic Psychotherapy
Simon Wessely	1956–	British	epidemiology, general hospital and combat psychiatry
Louis Jolyon West	1924–1999	American	Civil rights activist
Donald Winnicott	1896–1971	British	child psychiatry and psychoanalysis
Peter C. Whybrow		British	also researcher in bio-behavioral sciences.
Sula Wolff	1924–2009	British	stress in children, schizoid personality/autism
Irvin D. Yalom	1931–	American	researcher into group psychotherapy and existential psychotherapy at Stanford University
Charles H. Zeanah	1951–	American	Leading infant psychiatrist, attachment researcher, author
Larry J. Siever	1947–2021	American	Leading psychiatrist in the study of personality disorders

== See also ==
- Psychiatry
- American Board of Psychiatry and Neurology
- American Psychiatric Association
- Royal College of Psychiatrists

Lists

- List of cognitive scientists
- List of physicians
- List of psychologists
- List of fictional psychiatrists
