= Christine Dean =

British psychiatrist

Christine Dean FRCPsych (born 1939) is an English psychiatrist consulting at the Priory Hospital, Roehampton, the British Association of Performing Arts Medicine (BAPAM), The Helen Bamber Foundation, in her private practice and as a medical member of the Mental Health Review Tribunals, Ministry of Justice.

== Biography ==
Dean was born in Crewe, Cheshire, in 1939 and attended Crewe County Grammar School and won a state scholarship to study medicine at the University of Edinburgh and after qualifying practised general medicine and general practice in the West Midlands. She completed an Open University degree specialising in the history of art before training in psychiatry in Edinburgh.

In 1979 Dean joined the Medical Research Council Epidemiology Unit in Edinburgh under the directorship of Norman Kreitman and conducted collaborative research on the epidemiology of depression which involved interviewing a random sample of the female population in Edinburgh. The findings were that women who were working class, unemployed and divorced, separated or widowed had more than ten times the rate of depression and anxiety compared with women who were middle class, married or single and employed. Shortly after this Dean became a lecturer at the University of Edinburgh under Robert Kendell, who was head of department. She conducted research with Kendell on post-natal depression and puerperal psychosis and found that women who were having their first baby, those who had a caesarean section and those who were unmarried were more likely to develop puerperal psychosis following childbirth.

At this time Dean collaborated with Sir Patrick Forrest (Professor of Surgery at the University of Edinburgh) in the first random controlled study to compare the psychological effects of mastectomy, for breast cancer, compared with mastectomy and immediate breast reconstruction. The study demonstrated the psychological and practical benefits of immediate breast reconstruction and this is now routinely offered to women requiring mastectomy. In 1983 she obtained a MD from the University of Edinburgh presenting the thesis 'The psychosocial morbidity of mastectomy : a follow up study'. In 1982 Dean took up a consultant psychiatrist post in Manchester and with Francis Creed, established one of the first day hospitals to provide an alternative to hospital admissions for people with acute mental health problems. Whilst in Manchester she was appointed as one of the first medical Unit General Managers in the UK, following the Griffiths Report (1983), and managed the mental health services, the community services and the dental hospital at Central Manchester Health Authority. During this time Dean set up an Arts project for patients, START. The project resulted in some of the works produced by the patients being displayed in Manchester City Art Gallery.

Another innovative project by Dean, whilst she was in Manchester, was the establishment of a peripatetic day service with professionals visiting different community health centres and providing therapeutic activities and groups near to the clients' homes.

Dean conducted research in Manchester with Lynne Webster and Neil Kessell evaluating the recently introduced Mental Health Act 1983 to examine whether the new act was more protective of patients' civil liberties than the previous Mental Health Act 1959.

Dean moved to Birmingham in 1987 to take up a post as senior lecturer at the University of Birmingham. She was also a consultant psychiatrist responsible for the deprived inner city area of Sparkbrook which has a large south Asian population. She found that the psychiatric hospital services did not meet the needs of this population, especially the needs of Asian women. As a result, she set up a home treatment service, which was the first in the UK, as an alternative to hospital admission for people who had acute mental health problems.

Dean subsequently conducted research comparing the home treatment service with the standard hospital in-patient service and found that patients and their relatives preferred the home treatment service and that the outcome from the clinical point of view was the same in both groups; this was true of patients from non-Asian backgrounds as well as Asian backgrounds. Home treatment/crisis resolution services have since been adopted nationwide in the UK and are recommended in the NHS National Service Framework (1999) and the Mental Health Policy Implementation Guide (2001).

In 1990 Dean was asked to be a consultant with the Centre for Mental Health Service Development at King's College London. This organisation assisted NHS trusts throughout the UK to set up community services to enable them to provide alternatives to the large mental hospitals. Once alternatives were developed, these institutions were scaled down and closed as a result. Dean then became a director of the International Mental Health Network which was an organisation that linked together people in the UK and elsewhere in the world who were endeavouring to set up high quality community services. The International Mental Health Network also advised mental health services in Australia, New Zealand, the Czech Republic, England and Scotland who were setting up community services.

In 1998 Dean was appointed as Professor of Psychiatry and Clinical Director of Mental Health Services at Wolverhampton Mental Health Trust. During her years in Wolverhampton she established two new Home Treatment / Crisis Resolution services, an Early Intervention in Psychosis Service (for people aged 16 to 28) and an Assertive Outreach service for people with long-term mental health problems.

In 2003 Dean spent a year in Adelaide, South Australia as a director of a mental health service there and contributed to the development of community services.

Dean moved to London in 2004, where she was a consultant with the West London Mental Health Trust. She was a consultant responsible for clients of two new Home Treatment/ Crisis Resolution teams in West London and then for a newly established Assertive Outreach service.

Dean is employed by the Ministry of Justice, as medical member of the Mental Health Review Tribunal which hears the cases of people who are appealing against their detention under a section of the Mental Health Act 1983. She also worked as a consultant for the Helen Bamber Foundation which assist people who are victims of human rights abuse, seeing people who have mental health problems. Dean has maintained her interest in the arts and is a consultant psychiatrist to the British Association of Performing Arts Medicine. This organisation is for performing artists who have medical problems of any kind, including mental health problems.

Dean is a Visiting Consultant at the Priory Hospital Roehampton and has a private practice in central London.

== See also ==
- List of psychiatrists
