= Allan Johnston (psychiatrist) =

British sports psychiatrist

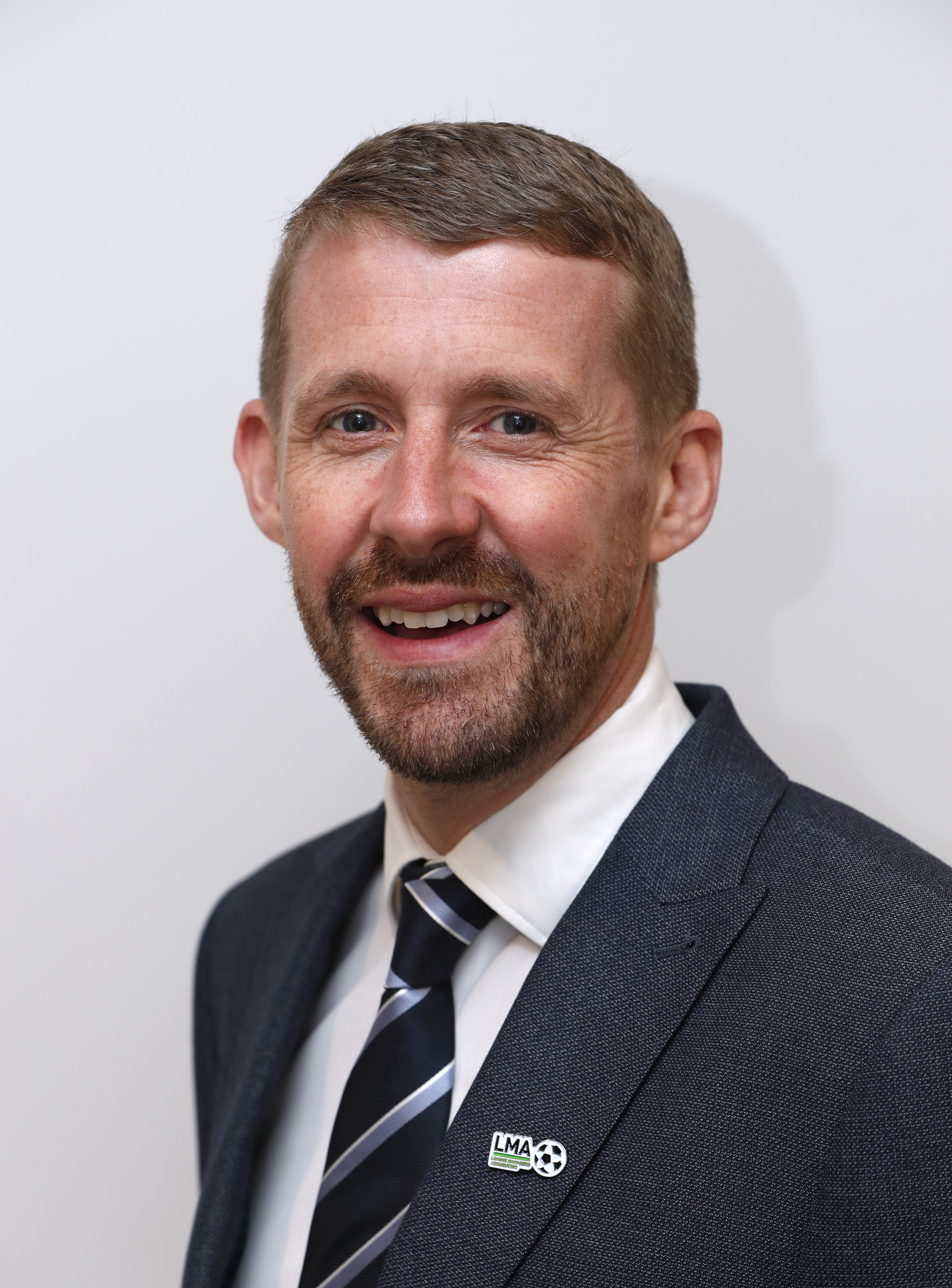
- Born: Mirfield, West Yorkshire, England
- Occupations: Sports psychiatrist, NHS consultant psychiatrist
- Years active: 2002 - present
- Employers: NHS; English Institute of Sport
- Organizations: State of Mind Sport; Sports Chaplaincy UK
- Awards: Doctor of the Year, Yorkshire Healthcare Awards, 2019; Stimulation in Women's Sport awarded by Everything in Sport, 2019; Collaboration and Team Working Award, UK Sport PLx Awards 2020

Dr Allan Johnston MBBS, MRCPsych, Cert.Med.Ed(IU) is a consultant psychiatrist with the National Health Service in the United Kingdom, working at Derbyshire Healthcare NHS Foundation Trust and a world leading Sports Psychiatrist at Spire Leeds Hospital working with professional athletes, dance artists, Premiership and Football League managers and coaches.

== Sports psychiatry ==
Johnston qualified as a medical doctor in 2002, and a RCPsych psychiatrist in 2005. He has been an NHS consultant psychiatrist since 2010 to present and a sport psychiatrist from 2012 to present.

Johnston was employed as a sports psychiatry doctor by the Bradford Bulls RLFC over the 2012/13 and 2013/14 seasons. Johnston worked as part of the backroom staff of coach Francis Cummins.

In 2016, Johnston co-founded the Sports and Exercise Psychiatry Special Interest Group (SEPSIG) alongside Prof. Alan Currie to develop education and governance for UK Sports Psychiatrists. The Group is managed by the Royal College of Psychiatrists and Johnston was the appointed Deputy Chair with a focus on co-coordinating training programs until July 2020. He remains an active supporter of the Group.

He is employed as the Sports Psychiatrist at Spire Perform, the Sports Medicine & Physiotherapy Clinic at Spire Leeds Hospital in Roundhay. (2017 to date) and sits on the UK Anti-Doping authority (UKAD) specialist register for ADHD Therapeutic Use Exemption assessments (2015 to date).

In 2018 Johnston was employed by the English Institute of Sport (EIS) as Sports Psychiatrist to the Mental Health Expert Panel providing mental healthcare to the Team GB Olympic and Paralympics teams. He provides medical care and supports the mental wellbeing of all athletes in preparation for the Tokyo Olympic Games.

In January 2019 Johnston was appointed as the first League Managers Association's (LMA) in-house Consultant Performance Psychiatrist, promoting the wellbeing of all managers and coaches across all four English football leagues and leading development of the game-wide wellbeing strategy across all four leagues.

Johnston is also the Sports Psychiatrist to Premiership Football team Burnley F.C. in a role to develop the club's mental health strategy and provide mental health care for the 1st team, academy players and coaching staff alike (2019 to 2020). In February 2020 Johnston welcomed a representative of Prince William and The Royal Foundation to Burnley F.C. to share learning around mental health and football. This contributed to the publication in July 2020 of the Mentally Healthy Football declaration committing to building a mentally healthy culture at all levels of the game.

In October 2020 Johnston was appointed Sports Psychiatrist to English Football League Team Rochdale A.F.C. as the first Sports Psychiatrist to work in EFL Football League One

== Suicide prevention ==
In his NHS role, Johnston chaired the Derbyshire Suicide Prevention Strategy Group 2013-2018 and led a range of innovations in the region including the development of the regional strategy, a greater involvement of service users in co-producing their own care and chairing Suicide Prevention conferences and World Suicide Prevention Day initiatives.

Notably on 10 September 2016 the Derbyshire Suicide Prevention group hosted the world's biggest to date (2020), World Suicide Prevention Day event with the support of Derby County F.C. and Newcastle United F.C.

In 2018 the Group's work with Public Health on training General Practitioners in Suicide Prevention strategies was nominated for a Health Service Journal (HSJ) award.

== Charity work ==
From 2012 to date, Johnston has volunteered as a sports psychiatrist and trustee to State of Mind Sport, a charity aiming to improve the mental health and wellbeing of athletes and their communities.

He is also an ambassador for Sports Chaplaincy UK, a charity providing spiritual and pastoral care to professional and amateur sport. (2020 to date).

== Awards ==
In December 2019 Johnston was awarded the Everything in Sport award for Stimulation in Women's Sport, awarded for supporting the mental health of female athletes.

At the end of 2019 Johnston was awarded the Doctor of the Year award at the Yorkshire Healthcare Awards.

In November 2020 the EIS Mental Health Expert Panel including Dr Johnston were awarded the Collaboration and Team Working Award at the UK Sport PLx Awards for their work, alongside the EIS Psychology and PLA Teams in supporting the mental health of athletes during the COVID-19 Pandemic.

== Papers and publications ==
- Johnston A and pro cyclists, Rachel Atherton, Tom Pidcock and Kye Whyte interviewed for Redbull article entitled "Mind over matter: how professional cyclists get into the ‘success’ zone". First published Sept 23, 2020. (Author, Maria David)
- Mistry AD, McCabe T, Currie A. The first ever case study book in sports psychiatry entitled "Case Studies in Sports Psychiatry”. Johnston A, Al-Dawoud M, Pattinson C; Chapter 7 Boxing – low mood and gambling. Cambridge University Press. Publishing date, July 2020.
- Prof Alan Currie, Dr Allan Johnston and colleagues. Contribution to Management of Mental Health Emergencies in Elite Athletes: A Narrative Review. Special edition of British Journal of Sports Medicine. First published May 16, 2019.
- Johnston A, Sanchez E. Resilience in Dance – Building Psychological Skills. One magazine, issue 6. Spring 2019.
- McCabe T, Johnston A. The Importance of Sports Psychiatry. British Journal of Sports Medicine (2018).
- Johnston A, McAllister-Williams R.H. Chapter 10; Psychotropic Drug Prescribing. The Oxford Handbook of Sports Psychiatry Oxford Psychiatry Library Series (2016).
- Rae M, Cooper P, Johnston A. Suicide Prevention: Tackling Stigma through Sport. Mental Health Practice Vol 20 (2016).
- Currie A, Johnston A. Psychiatric Disorders: The Psychiatrists contribution to sport. The International Review of Psychiatry Sports Psychiatry 2016: A Developing Field (2016).
- Linnington H, Johnston A, Kapur N, Gill P. Chapter 8: Accident and Emergency Psychiatry and Self Harm. Royal College of Psychiatrists textbook Seminars in Liaison Psychiatry. Gaskell Publications (2012).
- Abbas M, Walton R, Johnston A, Chikoore M. Evaluation of Teaching an integrated case formulation approach on quality of case formulations: A Randomised Controlled Trial. The Psychiatrist (Psychiatric Bulletin) (2012).
- Abbasi Y, Johnston A, Broadhurst M et al. Liaison Psychiatry: Can service development fulfil educational needs? Irish Journal of Psychological Medicine (2009).
- Farrand P, Rowe R M, Johnston A, Murdoch H. Prevalence, age of onset and demographic relationships of different areca nut habits amongst children in Tower Hamlets, London. British Dental Journal (2001).
