= Madeleine Mouton =

French serial killer

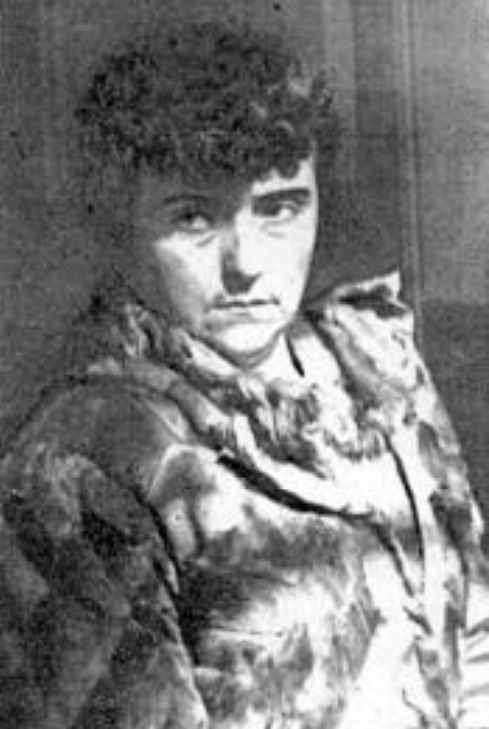
- Mouton in 1947
- Born: Madeleine Maxence Le Veller; April 15, 1910; Évreux, Normandy, France
- Died: April 10, 1948 (aged 37); Sidi Bel Abbès, Sidi Bel Abbès Province, French Algeria
- Other name: "The Berthelot Poisoner"
- Status: Executed by guillotine
- Convictions: Murder (7 counts); Attempted murder (4 counts)
- Penalty: Death

Details
- Victims: 4–7
- Span of crimes: 1943–1944
- Country: Algeria
- State: Sidi Bel Abbès
- Date apprehended: October 1944

Madeleine Mouton (née Madeleine Maxence Le Veller; April 15, 1910 – April 10, 1948), known as The Berthelot Poisoner (French: L'empoisonneuse de Berthelot) was a French serial killer who poisoned eleven people in Sidi Bel Abbès, Algeria, in 1943, seven of which were fatal. Convicted, sentenced to death and later executed for these crimes, she became the second-to-last French woman to be guillotined, and the only one to be executed in French Algeria.

== Early life and youth in France ==
Madeleine Maxence Le Veller was born on April 15, 1910, in Évreux, Normandy, the second of two daughters born to day laborer Jean Le Veller and factory worker Louise Gabrielle Latouche. Her parents separated when she was ten years old, due to her father's alcoholism, after which her mother took the children to live in Charleville-Mézières.

Le Veller attended school until the age of 14, when she obtained her certificat d'études primaires. At the time, people reported that she was a moody, vain child who was prone to lying, often claiming that she was of noble heritage. According to her sister Solange, Madeleine would walk around with an empty violin case so that people would believe that she was a musician. At age 17, she attempted to commit suicide by ingesting petrol.

While working at a buffet in the local train station, Madeleine met Clément Mouton, whom she would later marry in 1929, when she was 18. The couple had their first child in 1933, with Madeleine described as being "nervous" about the pregnancy. Sometime afterwards, Clément joined the Mobile Gendarmerie, and during his tenure there, several witnesses claimed that Madeleine had begun an affair with a Garrison officer. He later broke off their relationship.

== Move to Algeria ==
In 1940, Clément asked to be transferred to the city of Constantine in Algeria, with Madeleine accompanying him. She would later claim that the climate had derailed and "disturbed" her life, causing her to frequently have affairs, go on drinking binges and prioritize her sex life above everything else. At this time, Madeleine carried a pregnancy to term, but the birth was difficult and the child died after five days.

Due to her reputation, her husband transferred frequently, first to Molière in 1941 and then to Ksar Boukhari, where she gave birth to another child. She continued on with her behavior, and in mid-1942, Clément was transferred to Berthelot, where Madeleine was forbidden to live in the barracks. Because of this, she moved in with a woman named Madame Dez, and gave birth to a third child a few months later. In December of that year, she was finally allowed to the barracks.

There, she met up with a couple of friends she had met in France, the Leroux family, as the husband was also stationed in Berthelot. She also met the Chief Brigadier, with whom she would also start an affair. As she started taking out multiple loans and racking up debts, Mouton started making frequent trips to Sidi Bel Abbès, where she spent several days.

During 1943, several suspicious deaths occurred at Berthelot, all of which showed signs of acute poisoning. This aroused the suspicions of the village's paramedic and a doctor from Saïda. Rumors spread and attention turned to Madeleine Mouton, who had provided constant care and supposedly unfailing devotion to all the victims. Several other people in Berthelot, including her husband Clément, also presented identical symptoms, but survived. Around October 1943, Mouton's third child, aged ten months, died. In late 1943 or early 1944, the Mobile Gendarmerie was called in to investigate.

== The investigation ==
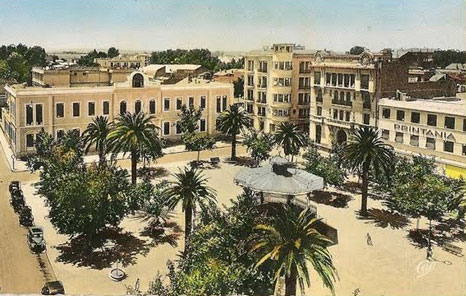
Place Carnot, the courthouse of Sidi Bel Abbès

Investigators revealed that, while staying with Madame Dez, Mouton had bought 200 grams of sodium arsenite from a local druggist, which she claimed was to get rid of ants. Her sister mentioned that she received a letter from her brother-in-law Clément, in which he said that he had suspicions about Madeleine's activities. Eventually, Madeleine was arrested in April 1944, and not long after, she confessed to poisoning 4 people, but vehemently denied responsibility for the rest.

The first poisonings occurred in January 1943, when Madame Leroux fell ill, followed only ten days later by her husband - the former succumbed, while the latter survived. At the time, Mouton was not a suspect, and even allowed M. Leroux and his daughter Micheline to stay with her. A fundraiser was organized ostensibly to collect 2,400 francs for Micheline, but it was swindled by Madeleine, who then went on to borrow 4,000 francs from a Madame Lamasse, which she claimed was to pay off the Leroux girl's tuition. A few weeks later, in April, Madame Lamasse's mother-in-law, Madame Juan, died from poisoning. In December, an elderly man surnamed Bene was succumbed to poisoning while under Mouton's care.

Mouton was initially imprisoned in Sidi Bel Abbès, and was then transferred to a prison in Algiers on October 12, 1944, so she could undergo a psychiatric evaluation. While there, she allegedly struck up a relationship with one of her jailers and claimed to have been impregnated, after which she was transferred to the maternity ward at Mustapha Hospital. She remained there for several weeks, not because of her faked pregnancy, but because of a gynaecological infection. During her stay, Mouton attempted to hide the real reason she was imprisoned and claimed to be a political prisoner who had been jailed for "expressing her admiration for Marshal Pétain a little too loudly". She managed to convince most of the staff and patients there, and was even entrusted with various tasks at the maternity ward.

On February 12, 1945, psychiatrist Antoine Porot submitted his report to the court, noting that Mouton was of sound mind and could be held criminally responsible, while also noting her heavy consumption of wine (several liters a day) and other liquors.

== Judgment and sentence ==
Madeleine Mouton was ultimately charged with eleven poisonings, amounting to seven murders and four attempted murders. Her lawyer, Maître Allégret, entered an insanity plea, claiming that his client had "lost her mind" and was a "lunatic entitled to internment." In the absence of sufficient evidence, most of the charges were dropped, excluding the four fatal poisonings to which she had confessed. As such, the trial began on November 15, 1947.

Only two days later, Mouton was found guilty on all counts and sentenced to death via jury verdict. The prosecutor, M. Coquilhat, stated that the severity of the verdict was due to the premeditated nature of the murders and the lack of remorse on Mouton's part. She would later petition President Vincent Auriol for a pardon, but was denied.

== Execution ==
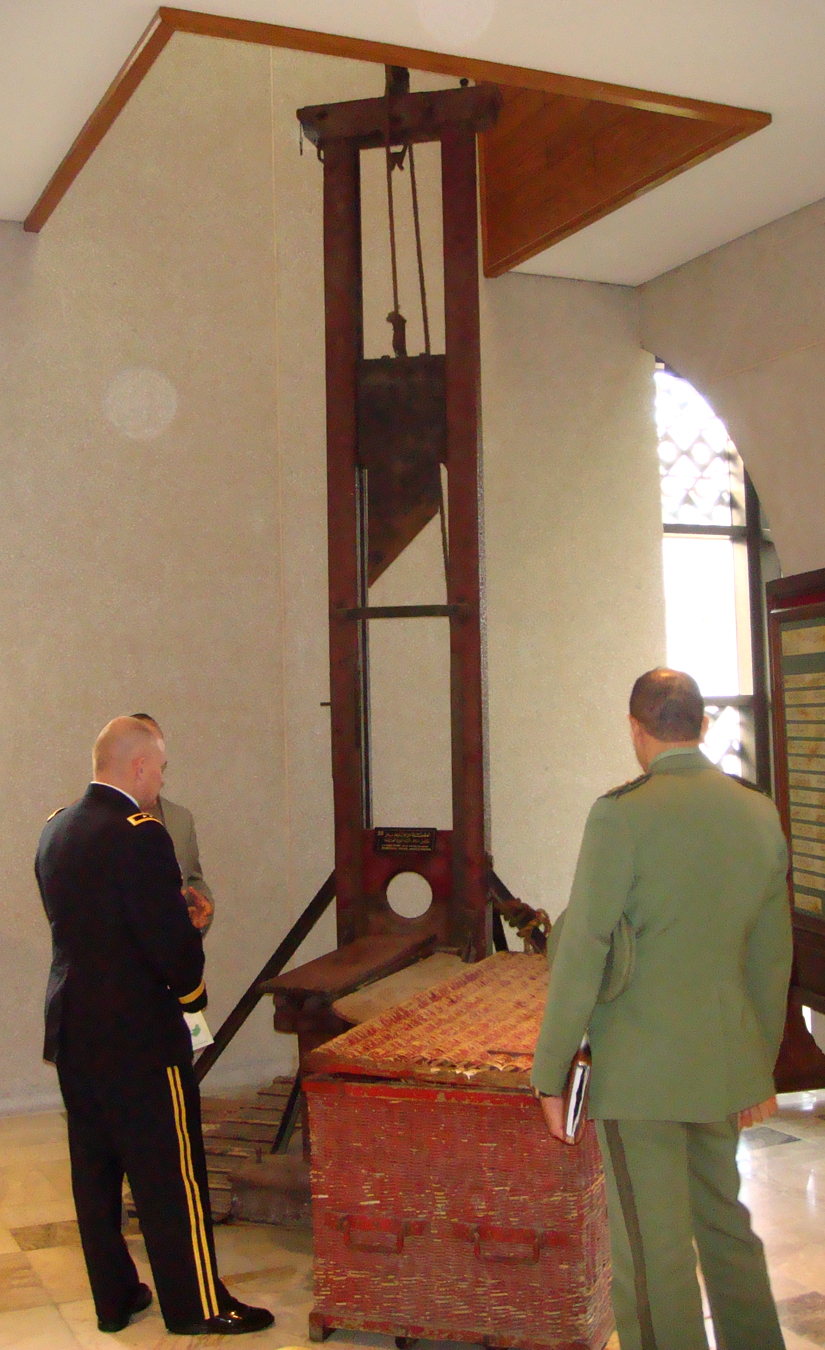
The guillotine used to execute Madeleine Mouton

On April 10, 1948, Madeleine Mouton was executed at 5:17 AM in the inner courtyard of the Sidi Bel Abbès prison. On the previous day, executioner Maurice Meyssonnier and his assistant André Berger met with her, posing as contractors who had come to measure her cell in order to repaint it. They gave their civilian clothes to the head warden, telling him that they would return early the next morning. That same evening, the warden gave Mouton her clothes to put on for the next day's outing.

When the executioners, this time additionally accompanied by Meyssonnier's 17-year-old son Fernand, arrived at dawn, Mouton - who up until then believed that her sentence would be commuted to life imprisonment - was informed of her imminent execution. Upon hearing this, she fainted, and a doctor had to be called in to wake her up. She then sought religious counsel, and after being led to the scaffold, she exclaimed "Farewell mom, I deserve it."

Her skirt had been pinned to her crotch, her hair pulled up and her blouse indented so as not to interfere with the stroke of the cleaver. When she was tilted over the guillotine, her breasts protruded and she started screaming "My children, my children!". Shortly afterwards, she was beheaded. Dr. Ayach drew up the death certificate, and the body was buried in the Sidi Bel Abbès cemetery.

== See also ==
- Capital punishment in Algeria
- List of serial killers by country
