= NCMH =

NCMH may refer to:

- Manihiki Island Airport in the Cook Islands
- National Center for Mental Health in the Philippines

== See also ==
- National Collaborating Centre for Mental Health (NCCMH)
