= IAFP =

IAFP may stand for:

- Institute of Advanced Financial Planners, awarding professional certification in financial services
- International Association for Forensic Psychotherapy, concerned with forensic psychotherapy
- International Association for Food Protection, an American non-profit association
