= Passive drinking =

Adverse effects of alcohol consumption on others

Table from the 2010 DrugScience study ranking various drugs (legal and illegal) based on statements by drug-harm experts. This study rated alcohol the most harmful drug overall, and the only drug more harmful to others than to the users themselves.

Passive drinking, analogous to passive smoking, refers to the adverse consequences experienced by those around someone who is experiencing alcohol intoxication. These include the unborn fetus and children of parents who drink excessively, drunk drivers, accidents, domestic violence and alcohol-related sexual assaults.

On 2 February 2010 Eurocare, the European Alcohol Policy Alliance, organised a seminar on "The Social Cost of Alcohol : Passive drinking". On 21 May 2010 the World Health Organization reached a consensus at the World Health Assembly on a resolution to confront the harmful use of alcohol.

== See also ==
- Alcoholism
- Binge drinking
