= John Gordon Clark =

American psychiatrist (1926–1999)

- Born: 1926; United States
- Died: 1999 (aged 72–73); Massachusetts
- Education: Harvard Medical School, M.D. Macalester College, B.S.
- Known for: research on cults
- Awards: Psychiatrist of the Year, Psychiatric Times, 1991
- Scientific career
- Fields: psychiatry
- Workplaces: Harvard University

John 'Jack' Gordon Clark (1926–1999) was a Harvard psychiatrist known for his research on the alleged damaging effects of cults.

== Academic career ==
Clark was a faculty member at the Harvard Medical School and was part of the staff at McLean Hospital.

Clark was a preeminent researcher on the harm of cults and became the leading figure in public opposition to cults in the 1970s. He studied groups like the Unification Church, the International Society for Krishna Consciousness and the Church of Scientology. He founded the Boston Personal Development Institute, which treated current and former cult members. He proposed that cult recruitment was capable of manipulating psychologically healthy individuals, and did not solely target mentally or emotionally conflicted people.

Clark developed a criterion of nine features common to cults: a ruling leader who claims unique abilities and responsibilities, absolutist belief systems, totalitarian management, disregard for secular law, disregard for human rights and personalities, control and ritualization over sexual intimacy, conformity, a focus on money-gathering or providing labor for the group, and methodical recruitment and retention systems.

Clark was an expert witness in a legal case where a man attempted to place his adult son under protective guardianship, alleging that his son had been brainwashed by the International Society for Krishna Consciousness. He was the target of harassment from the Church of Scientology after he testified against it to the Vermont legislature in 1976. The organization filed two lawsuits against him, which were both dismissed. In 1985, Clark sued L. Ron Hubbard, founder of Scientology, for conspiring to "destroy" and harass him. The suit was settled out of court in 1988 for an undisclosed amount of money. As part of the settlement, Clark agreed to stop speaking about the organization.

The Psychiatric Times named him 1991 psychiatrist of the year, describing him as "a quiet, courageous man of conviction, who was fighting an all-too-lonely and unappreciated battle against well-financed, ruthless organizations."

== Works ==
- Clark, John G. Cults. Journal of the American Medical Association. 242, 279–281. 1979
- Clark, John G.: On the further study of destructive cultism. In Halperin (ed.), 363–368
