= Michel Craplet =

French psychiatrist

Michel Craplet is French psychiatrist, an expert in alcohol-related problems, their treatment and prevention. He is senior medical advisor of French Association Nationale de Prévention en Alcoologie et Addictologie (ANPAA).

Michel Craplet has been Chairman of European Alcohol Policy Alliance (Eurocare) since its creation in 1990, served as advisor to WHO's mission in Moldavia, and member of the expert group “Alcohol and Health” of the European Union.

== Publications ==
- À consommer avec modération (Consume with Moderation) Paris,Editions Odile Jacob (2005) ISBN 2-7381-1641-8
- Passion alcool (Passion for Drinking), Paris, Editions Odile Jacob (2000) ISBN 2-7381-0820-2,
- Parler d'alcool Paris, La Martiniere
