= Palombo =

Palombo is a surname. Notable people with the surname include:

- Angelo Palombo (born 1981), Italian footballer
- Inés Palombo (born 1985), Argentine actress and model
- Stanley Palombo, American psychiatrist

== See also ==
- Palombi, Italian surname
- Mount Palombo, a mountain of Marie Byrd Land, Antarctica
