= Estela V. Welldon =

Argentine-British psychiatrist and writer

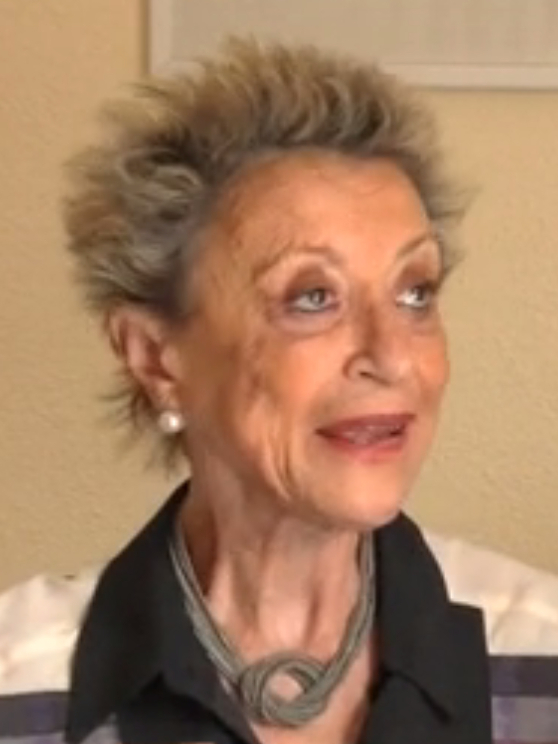
Estela Welldon

Estela V. Welldon is an honorary consultant psychiatrist in forensic psychotherapy at the Tavistock and Portman NHS Trust.

== Biography ==
Born in Mendoza, Argentina, she studied medicine at Universidad Nacional de Cuyo. She founded (and has been elected honorary president for life) of the International Association for Forensic Psychotherapy in 1991.

She works privately as a psychoanalytical psychotherapist and organizational consultant. She is a member of the British Association of Psychotherapists, the British Psychoanalytic Council, the Institute of Group Analysis, the American Group Psychotherapy Association and the International Association of Group Psychotherapy.

Welldon is the author of numerous articles and chapters as well as a number of books: Mother Madonna Whore, the Idealization and Denigration of Motherhood (Free Association Books, 1988, ISBN 1-892746-62-X), Sadomasochism (2002, ISBN 1-84046-378-3), Playing with Dynamite: A Personal Approach to the Psychoanalytic Understanding of Perversions, Violence, and Criminality (2011, (ISBN 1-85575-742-7), and her autobiography Fragments from an Extraordinary Life: Thriving on Adversity (Karnac Books, 2026, ISBN 9781800133792). Welldon was the primary editor of A Practical Guide to Forensic Psychotherapy (1997, ISBN 1-85302-389-2).

== Awards and honours ==
In 1997, Welldon was awarded an Honorary Doctorate in Sciences from Oxford Brookes University in recognition of her work in developing and promoting forensic psychotherapy.

In January 2013, Welldon received an honorary membership in the American Psychoanalytic Association.
