= Shubulade Smith =

British academic

Shubulade Smith CBE
- Other name: Lade Smith
- Education: Guy's Hospital Medical School
- Occupations: Academic and consultant psychiatrist
- Known for: Elected the first black President of the Royal College of Psychiatrists

Shubulade Smith CBE, also known as Lade Smith, is a British academic and consultant psychiatrist at the South London and Maudsley NHS Foundation Trust (SLaM). She is a senior lecturer at King's College, London and Clinical Director at the NCCMH (National Collaborating Centre for Mental Health) and forensic services at SLaM, and as of 2023, served as the first black President of the Royal College of Psychiatrists.

== Early life and education ==
Smith grew up in Manchester, England. Her close contact with a wide range of families of different class and stature led her to try and better understand human interaction, including violence, physical problems in mental illness, and the effects of antipsychotic drugs. She attended St Thomas Aquinas High School, Manchester, and entered Guy's Hospital Medical School in 1985, earning her Bachelor of Medicine, Bachelor of Surgery (MBBS) in 1991.

== Career ==
Smith joined the South London and Maudsley NHS Foundation Trust in September 1999 as a consultant psychiatrist. In July 2004, she also became a clinical senior lecturer at the Institute of Psychiatry. In 2017, Smith became Clinical Director for the NCCMH, a collaboration between the Royal College of Psychiatrists and University College London that works to improve mental health services and rectify inequalities in mental health. In February 2020, Smith then also became Clinical Director for forensic services at SLaM.

Currently, Smith is also the Clinical and Strategic Director of the National Collaborating Centre for Mental Health (NCCMH). In this role, she has designed and developed services to improve the quality of patient care, including The Community Mental Health Framework for Adults and Older Adults and The Advancing Mental Health Equality Resource.

On 19 January 2023, she was elected the first black President of the Royal College of Psychiatrists, winning 54.1% of the vote. She began serving on 11 July 2023.

== Research and advocacy ==
Smith has always focused on academics, including research into the hormonal and reproductive effects of antipsychotic medications, the effect of vitamin D in reducing psychosis, and in particular, the mental health issues of those in minority ethnic groups. Smith published a paper in The Lancet highlighting how almost half the explanations given for higher rates of detention among Black people were unsupported by evidence and are based on cultural stereotypes and assumptions. She says: "Future research should avoid cultural stereotypes and assumptions, and amalgamation of ethnic groups should be discouraged to better inform policy and practice."

Smith has campaigned for a better understanding of mental health issues, and has raised awareness about racism in healthcare, which she believes explains why there is generally a higher proportion of black people detained under the mental health service. She has commented that "psychiatry is not where the problem starts". Smith's research into the short-term management of violent behaviour and reducing forced injection during restraint has been adopted as part of national guidance and now forms part of the recommendations for Rapid Tranquillisation in the recent NaPICU/BAP guidelines.

In 2015, she led an inquest into the suicide of a woman in Pembrokeshire three years earlier, saying that a better understanding of mental health issues might have prevented this. She has said that "most people with psychosis are not violent" and that other factors from growing up make them violent, as she saw with classmates. Smith would like "a bigger sociopolitical response" to the problems and concerns with mental health, how it affects families, and how important it is to treat any issues early. She is concerned that people with severe mental illness (SMI) will die around 15 to 20 years earlier than the general population.

Smith also campaigns for better resourcing of mental health services, noting that austerity measures have likely been associated with increases in mental health crises and involuntary admissions. Smith has also been involved in modernising the Mental Health Act. The recommendations in the report Reasons behind the rising rate of admissions under the Mental Health Act have been reviewed by central government and the recommendations of the MHARAC (Mental Health of African and Caribbean) group have been adopted by the Cabinet Office. The Mental Health Act White Paper currently in preparation (as of 2019) was based on the recommendations of the Independent Review, of which Smith was the deputy chair.

She has commented that the 2025 proposed assisted dying legislation in England and Wales did not adequately address whether better care services might affect the decision of a terminally ill person about whether they wanted an assisted death.

== Selected publications ==
- Smith, Shubulade; O'Keane, Veronica; Murray, Robin (2002). "Sexual dysfunction in patients taking conventional antipsychotic medication". British Journal of Psychiatry. 181: 49–55. doi:10.1192/bjp.181.1.49. PMID 12091263.
- Meaney, AM; et al. (2004). "Effects of long-term prolactin-raising antipsychotic medication on bone mineral density in patients with schizophrenia". British Journal of Psychiatry. 184 (6): 503–508. doi:10.1192/bjp.184.6.503. PMID 15172944.
- Smith, S; Yeomans, D; Busche, CJ; et al. (2007). "A well-being programme in severe mental illness. Reducing risk for physical ill-health: A post-programme service evaluation at 2 years". Eur. Psychiatry. 22 (7): 413–418. doi:10.1016/j.eurpsy.2007.07.002. PMID 17765483. S2CID 37461980.
- Smith, SM (2010). "Gender differences in antipsychotic prescribing". International Review of Psychiatry. 22 (5): 472–484. doi:10.3109/09540261.2010.515965. PMID 21047160. S2CID 28436889.
