= James B. Potash =

American psychiatrist and academic

James B. Potash is an American psychiatrist, researcher, and academic leader. He is currently the Henry Phipps Professor and Director (chair) of the Department of Psychiatry and Behavioral Sciences at Johns Hopkins University School of Medicine.

== Early life and education ==
Potash graduated from Yale College in 1984 with a degree in English. After serving in the Peace Corps in Senegal, he pursued a career in medicine. He earned a master's degree in public health from Johns Hopkins University, focusing on epidemiology and international health, and his M.D. from Johns Hopkins School of Medicine in 1993.

After completing an internship in internal medicine at Johns Hopkins Bayview Medical Center, Potash became a resident and later chief resident in psychiatry at Johns Hopkins Hospital. He joined the faculty of the Department of Psychiatry and Behavioral Sciences at Johns Hopkins in 1998.

== Research and Public Engagement ==
Potash is a renowned researcher in the field of psychiatric genetics, focusing on the genetic and epigenetic basis of mood disorders such as depression and bipolar disorder. His prolific research output includes over 215 publications, and his work has been consistently funded by the National Institutes of Health for two decades.

In addition to his academic publications, Potash has engaged in public education about depression through his role as co-director of the Johns Hopkins Mood Disorders Program. He has authored a series of columns for ABC News discussing topics such as postpartum depression and distinguishing depression from sadness. In these columns, he provides clear explanations of the signs, symptoms, and treatments for depression to help the public better understand this common but often misunderstood condition.

Potash's other notable research contributions include:

- Investigating the genetic basis of psychotic forms of bipolar disorder
- Exploring epigenetic mechanisms linking stress to depression
- Co-directing a project analyzing DNA sequences to identify genetic variations associated with bipolar disorder
- Serving on the steering committee of the Bipolar Sequencing Consortium, which aggregates data from multiple genetic studies

== Career ==
Prior to his current role, Potash served as chair and department executive officer of the Department of Psychiatry at the University of Iowa Carver College of Medicine from 2011 to 2017. There, he strengthened research on psychiatric illness mechanisms and fostered collaborations between investigators, clinicians, and educators.

As the director of the Department of Psychiatry and Behavioral Sciences at Hopkins, Potash oversaw the creation of the Center for Psychedelic and Consciousness Research in 2019, the first such center in the United States and the largest in the world at the time of its founding, with $17 million in philanthropy. The Center does leading work in the use of psilocybin to treat psychiatric disorders like major depressive disorder. He has also helped establish four new Precision Medicine Centers of Excellence (PMCoE), aimed at identifying disease sub-types and targeting treatments—for Alzheimer's disease, psychosis, mood disorders, and schizoaffective disorders.

Potash has facilitated the creation of the Johns Hopkins Personalized Care in Psychiatry program in Baltimore and new psychiatric services at Sibley Hospital in Washington, DC, and Suburban Hospital in Bethesda, Maryland. In addition, he established a new track-based system within the Johns Hopkins psychiatric residency training program to allow trainees to grow in expertise and as leaders.

In addition to his research and leadership roles, Potash maintains an active clinical practice treating patients with depression and bipolar disorder. He has also held leadership positions in major professional organizations, including the International Society of Psychiatric Genetics, the American Psychopathological Association, the National Network of Depression Centers, and the American Association of Chairs of Departments of Psychiatry.
