= Maurice Meyssonnier =

French executioner

Maurice Meyssonnier was a Chief executioner in French Algeria. Meyssonnier family is linked to executioners as far back as the 16th century.

Meyssonnier performed, among many others, the last guillotining of a woman (Madeleine Mouton in 1948) in Algeria, which was the second-to-last female guillotining in France and her colonies.

He was succeeded by his son, Fernand Meyssonnier, who from young age served his father as assistant and eventually became the last executioner in French Algeria, even if formally never appointed, as Maurice retained his position but ceased to carry out the death sentences.

A communist by his political belief, Meyssonnier in addition to his executioner duties was also a bar owner.

,
