= Palombi =

Palombi is a surname. Notable people with the surname include:

- Antonello Palombi (1968–2026), Italian operatic tenor
- Simone Palombi (born 1996), Italian professional footballer

== See also ==
- Palombo
