= Kenneth Rawnsley =

English psychiatrist (1926–1992)

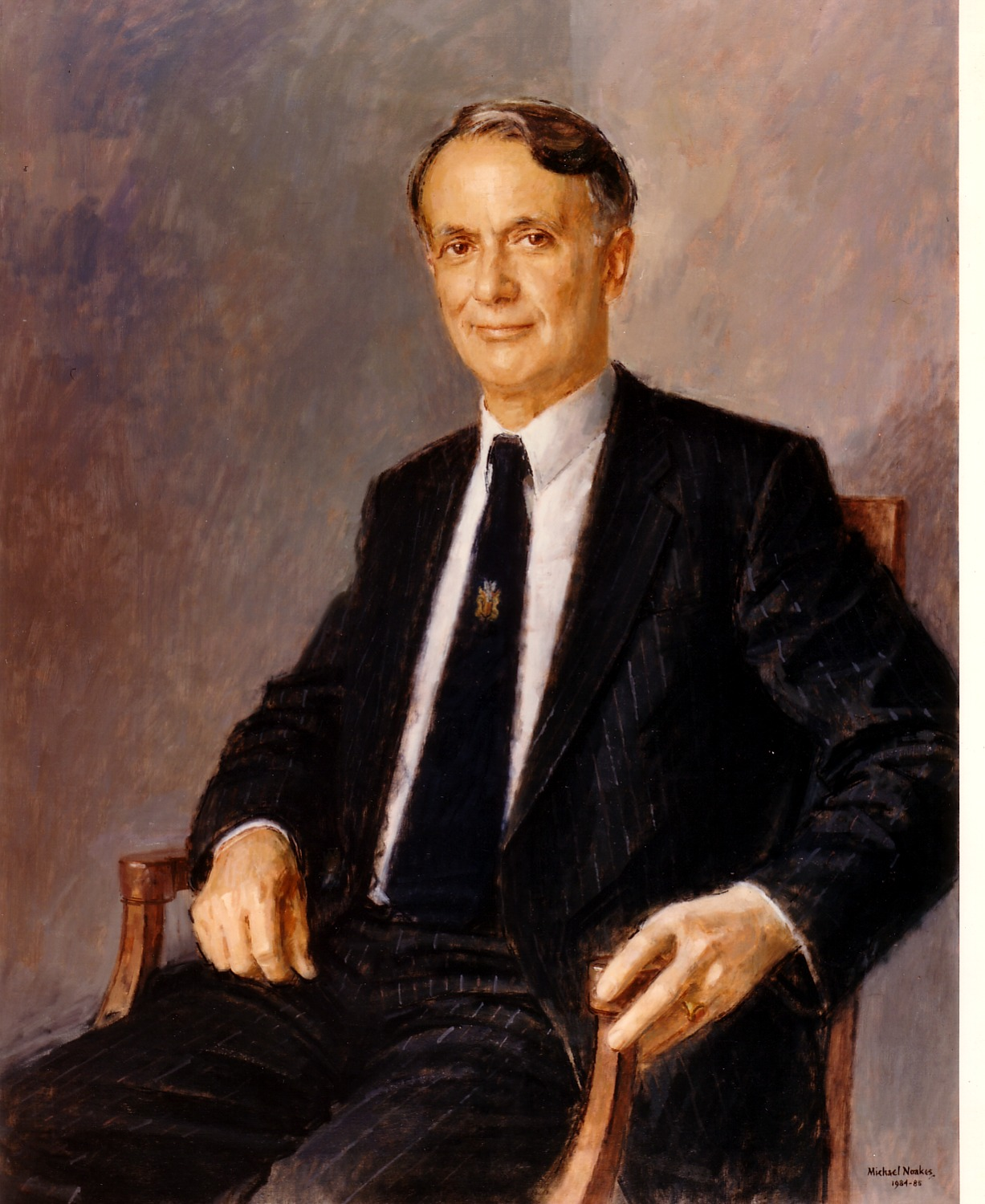
Portrait commissioned by the Royal College of Psychiatrists on his election as president

Professor Kenneth Rawnsley, CBE, (1926–1992) of University Hospital of Wales was an English psychiatrist who served as the president of the Royal College of Psychiatrists from 1981 to 1984.

Rawnsley was brought up and educated in Burnley, Lancashire, later studying at Manchester University, where he obtained his medical qualification in 1948. He worked for a time in Canada, on the Stirling County Epidemiological Project, before joining the Medical Research Council Social Psychiatry Unit in London and Cardiff.
