= Jacob H. Friedman =

American physician

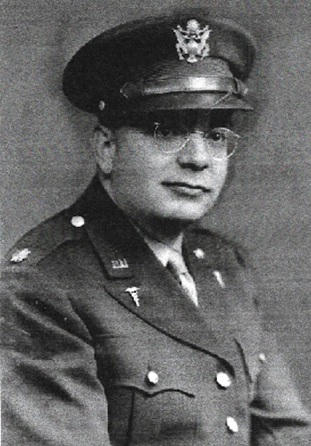

Jacob H. Friedman (born 1905 in New York, New York - died January 28, 1973, in Bronx, New York) was an American psychiatrist, one of the pioneers of geriatric psychiatry and an authority on marriage phobia. He was a professor of psychiatry at Albert Einstein College of Medicine and published over one hundred peer-reviewed papers in his field.

Friedman established a geriatric psychiatry program at Lebanon Hospital in 1961 and later served as chairman of the neuropsychiatry department at Fordham Hospital. He also headed the geriatric psychiatry program at the Bronx State Psychiatric Hospital.

Friedman's expert testimony at the civil trial of cartoonist Frank Moser, accused of running down the son of Lindbergh baby kidnapper Richard Bruno Hauptmann, proved decisive in securing a verdict for Hauptmann's widow.

Friedman graduated from City College and Tulane Medical School (1929). He did additional training at the New York Psychoanalytic Institute.
