= John Cox (psychiatrist) =

British psychiatrist

John Cox of the North Staffs Hospital Centre, Stoke-on-Trent, was president of the Royal College of Psychiatrists from 1999 to 2002.
