= Mike Shooter =

British psychiatrist

Mike Shooter of Nevill Hall Hospital, Abergavenny, was president of the Royal College of Psychiatrists from 2002 to 2005.
