= Ira Glick =

American psychiatrist

Ira Glick is an American psychiatrist known for his research into the psychopathology and treatment of schizophrenia. He is currently Professor Emeritus of Psychiatry and Behavioral Sciences at Stanford Medical School, and Director of the Schizophrenia Research Clinic at Stanford Hospital.

== Background ==
Dr. Glick obtained a B.S. from Dickinson College in 1957 and an M.D. from New York Medical College in 1961, spending time thereafter at Beth Israel Hospital and Zucker Hillside Hospital in New York City, and Mt. Zion Hospital in San Francisco. Glick interned at Harvard Medical School, and was a Fulbright Research Scholar in 1987.

== Active projects ==
Dr. Glick is one of the editors of the ASCP Model Psychopharmacology Curriculum for Training Directors and Teachers of Psychopharmacology in Psychiatric Residency Programs. This resource is used in residency programs in the US.
