= National Collaborating Centre for Mental Health =

Mental health collaboration

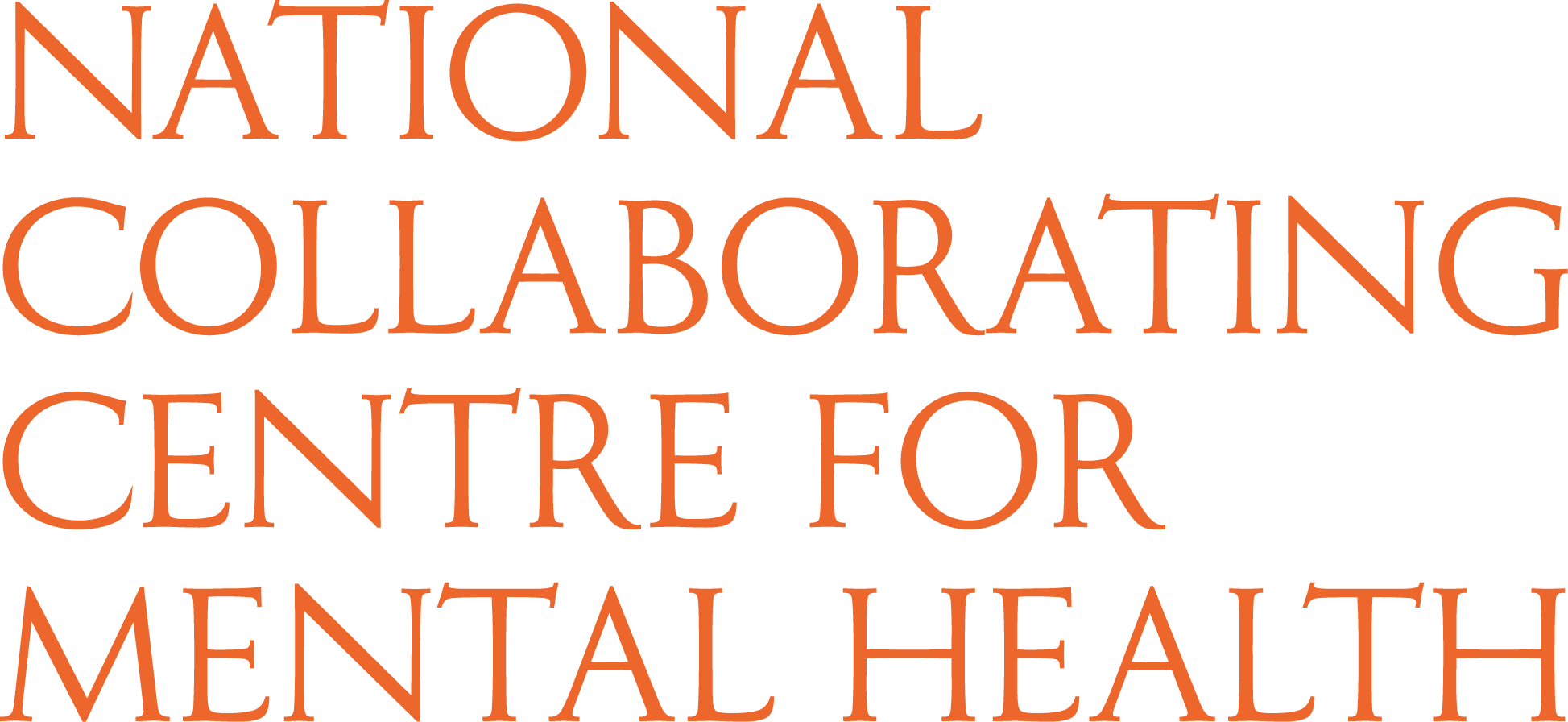

Agency overview
- Headquarters: Royal College of Psychiatrists, 21 Prescot Street, London
- Agency executives: Professor Tim Kendall, Medical Director; Professor Steve Pilling, Academic Director; Dr Shubulade Smith CBE, National Clinical Director; Tom Ayers, Senior Associate Director
- Website: www.rcpsych.ac.uk/improving-care/nccmh

The National Collaborating Centre for Mental Health (NCCMH) is a collaboration between the Royal College of Psychiatrists and the Centre for Outcomes Research and Effectiveness at University College London (UCL). The NCCMH aims to promote the role of evidence synthesis in making informed judgments about healthcare policy. The NCCMH has a history of developing guidelines, conducting systematic reviews and developing implementation guidance for commissioners and service providers. Formed in 2001, on 1 April 2016 a new guideline development centre, the National Guideline Alliance, based at the Royal College of Obstetricians and Gynaecologists took over the clinical guideline programme that had been run by NCCMH.

== NICE clinical guidelines ==
The NCCMH began producing clinical guidelines for the National Institute for Health and Care Excellence (NICE). It produced the first NICE guideline on schizophrenia, the first guideline on service user experience, and the first guideline in collaboration with the Social Care Institute for Excellence (SCIE) on dementia. This work led to further developments in the field of mental health, providing the evidence base that has supported the National Service Framework and the Improving Access to Psychological Therapies (IAPT) programme for depression and anxiety disorders.

The NICE clinical guideline on schizophrenia, developed by the NCCMH, was twice recognised by the World Health Organization as being the best developed internationally available guideline on that topic. A number of guides have also been translated and adopted or adapted by other healthcare systems, including those of Italy, Australia and Slovenia. The NCCMH has also supported several other countries as part of NICE International, establishing guideline development programmes. Countries included: the Netherlands, working with the WHO collaborating centre Trimbos; Georgia; Turkey; and the USA, working with the American Psychological Association. The NCCMH have also advised on the development of mental health services in South Korea.

== Independent systematic reviews ==
The NCCMH has conducted several independently funded systematic reviews:

- Tourette syndrome in children and young people, for the Academy for Royal Colleges
- E-mediated therapies and computer-based applications for the prevention and treatment of mental health problems, for MindEd
- Community health and social care services for coexisting severe mental illness and substance misuse, for NICE Public Health.

== Mental health care pathways ==
In October 2014, NHS England and the Department of Health jointly published Achieving Better Access to Mental Health Services by 2020 as part of the government’s extended commitment to achieving parity of esteem for mental and physical health. The publication was based on and led to further key initiatives and policy documents that committed to improving access to mental health care, standardising the quality of that care and creating a financially sustainable system.

The NCCMH was commissioned by NHS England and NICE to develop mental health care pathways to support the delivery of the ambitions set out in The Five Year Forward View for Mental Health. The pathways set out the evidence base and recommendations for providing timely, equal access and effective treatment and care. They also provide guidance to commissioners and service providers on how to implement the recommendations. The pathways are to be implemented by clinical commissioning group (CCG) commissioners and mental health providers, working collaboratively with service users, their families or carers, and partner organisations. The guidance is also useful for allied professional organisations, health and social care providers, health and social care regulators, local authorities, educational organisations and government agencies.

== See also ==
- Royal College of Psychiatrists
- National Health Service (England)
- National Institute for Health and Care Excellence
- NHS Improvement
- Mental health trust

General:

- Mental health in the United Kingdom
