= List of fictional psychiatrists =

Name	Work	Medium	Author/Distributor	Actor(s)
Misir Ali	Several (See Misir Ali)	Novel series and films	Humayun Ahmed	Abul Khair, Abul Hayat, Jayanta Chattopadhyay, Ashish Khandaker, Shatabdi Wadud, Chanchal Chowdhury, Humayun Faridi
Dr. Alfred Bellows	I Dream of Jeannie	TV series	NBC	Hayden Rorke
Dr. Alistair Crown	A Solitary Grief	novel	Bernice Rubens	
Dr. Andrey Yefimitch Ragin	"Ward No. 6"	short story	Anton Chekhov	
Dr. Cliff Patel	Silver Linings Playbook	film	Weinstein Company	Anupam Kher
Dr. Benjamin "Ben" Harmon	American Horror Story	TV series	FX	Dylan McDermott
Dr. Ben Sobel	Analyze This & Analyze That	1999 film, 2002 sequel	Warner Brothers	Billy Crystal
Dr. Bernie Feld	Hope Springs	film	Columbia Pictures	
Dr. Beverly Barlowe	Eureka	TV series	Syfy	Debrah Farentino
Dr. Bill Capa	Color of Night	film	Cinergi Pictures Entertainment	Bruce Willis
Dr. Bill Hoffman	Help Me Help You	TV series	ABC	
Dr. Charles Kroger	Monk	TV series	USA Network	Stanley Kamel
Dr. Charles Render	He Who Shapes	novella	Roger Zelazny	
Dr. Craig Huffstodt	Huff	TV series	Showtime	Hank Azaria
Dr. Daniel P. Schreber	Dark City	film	New Line Cinema	
Dr. Dick Diver	Tender Is the Night	novel	F. Scott Fitzgerald	
Dr. Elliot Kupferberg	The Sopranos	TV series	HBO	Peter Bogdanovich
Dr. Emil Slyker	"A Deskful of Girls"	short story	Fritz Leiber	
Dr. Frasier Crane	Cheers; Frasier	TV sitcom	NBC	Kelsey Grammer
Dr. Gail Adamson Baldwin	General Hospital	TV series	ABC	Susan Brown
Dr. Gideon Largeman	Garden State	film	Fox Searchlight Pictures	Ian Holm
Gag Halfrunt	The Hitchhiker's Guide to the Galaxy	radio et al.	Douglas Adams	
Dr. Henry Sikorsky	The Dream Team	film	Universal Studios	
Dr. Isaac Barr	Final Analysis	film	Warner Bros.	
Jacob's doctor	Jacob's Ladder	film	TriStar Pictures	Lewis Black
Dr. James Harvey	Casper; The Spooktacular New Adventures of Casper	film, TV series	Universal Studios	
Dr. Janet Ross	The Terminal Man	film	Warner Bros.	Joan Hackett
Dr. Jennifer Melfi	The Sopranos	TV series	HBO	Lorraine Bracco
Dr. George Huang	Law and Order: Special Victims Unit	TV series	NBC	B.D. Wong
Dr. Grace Foley	Waking the Dead	TV series	BBC	
Dr. Bill Beecroft	Red Dragon and sequels	novels, films	Thomas Harris	
Dr. Hollingshead	The Secret Life of Walter Mitty	short story, film	Metro-Goldwyn-Mayer	
Dr. Hugh Beale	St. Elsewhere	TV series	CBS	G.W. Bailey
Dr. Iggy Frome	New Amsterdam	TV series	NBC	Tyler Labine
Dr. Igor	Veronika Decides to Die	novel	Paulo Coelho	
Dr. Jonathan Banks	Side Effects	film	Open Road Films	Jude Law
Capt. Josiah J. Newman	Captain Newman, M.D.	film	Universal Studios	Gregory Peck
Admiral Katrina Cornwell	Star Trek: Discovery	TV series	CBS All Access	Jayne Brook
Dr. Lainey Winters	General Hospital	TV series	ABC	
Dr. Laura Horton	Days of Our Lives	soap opera	NBC	
Dr. Laszlo Kreizler	The Alienist, The Angel of Darkness	novels	Caleb Carr	
Dr. Lawrence Jacoby	Twin Peaks	TV series	ABC	Russ Tamblyn
Dr. Leigh Sapien	CSI: Crime Scene Investigation	TV series	CBS	Brenda Strong
Dr. Jane Falifax	Halifax f.p.	TV series	Nine Network	Rebecca Gibney
Dr. Leo Marvin	What About Bob?	film	Touchstone Pictures	Richard Dreyfuss
Dr. Lilith Sternin	Cheers; Frasier	TV sitcom	NBC	Bebe Neuwirth
Dr. Linda Freeman	Two and a Half Men	TV sitcom	CBS	
Dr. Martin Dysart	Equus	play	Peter Shaffer	
Dr. Malcolm Crowe	The Sixth Sense	film	Barry Mendel Productions	Bruce Willis
Major Sanderson	Catch-22	novel	Joseph Heller	
Dr. Marvin Monroe	The Simpsons	TV cartoon series	Matt Groening (creator)	
Dr. Marlena Evans	Days of Our Lives	soap opera	NBC	Deidre Hall
Dr. Mellinger	"Minus One"	short story	J. G. Ballard	
Dr. Minerva	It's Kind of a Funny Story	film	Focus Features	Viola Davis
Dr. Murchison	Spellbound	film	United Artists	
Dr. Nate Getz	NCIS: Los Angeles	TV series	CBS	
Dr. Nathan R. Conrad	Don't Say a Word	film	Regency Enterprises	
Dr. Neven Bell	Monk	TV series	USA Network	
Dr. Niles Crane	Frasier	TV sitcom	NBC	David Hyde Pierce
Dr. Otto Scratchansniff	Animaniacs	TV cartoon series	Warner Bros.	Long John Baldry
Dr. Peter Silberman (Note: The character of Dr. Silberman is described in The Terminator as a psychologist. In the sequels Terminator 2: Judgment Day and Terminator 3: Rise of the Machines the character is retconned as a psychiatrist.)	The Terminator; Terminator 2: Judgment Day; Terminator 3: Rise of the Machines	films	Orion Pictures	Earl Boen
Dr. Paul Weston	In Treatment	TV series	HBO	Gabriel Byrne
Professor Plum	Clue	film	Paramount Pictures	Christopher Lloyd
Dr. Richard Greville	Running Wild	novella	J.G. Ballard	
Dr. Rachel Armstrong	Home and Away	soap opera	Alan Bateman	Amy Mathews
Dr. Rosen	A Beautiful Mind	film	Universal Pictures	Christopher Plummer
Dr. Sara Iijima	Private Psycho Lesson	TV series	U-Jin (creator)	
Dr. Sidney Freedman	M*A*S*H	TV series	Larry Gelbart (creator)	
Dr. Stanley Keyworth	The West Wing	TV series	Aaron Sorkin (creator)	Adam Arkin
Dr. Tobias Fünke	Arrested Development	TV sitcom	Fox Broadcasting	David Cross
Dr. Tyrone Berger	Ordinary People	film	Paramount	Judd Hirsch
Dr. Victor Stephanson	What a Way to Go!	film	20th Century Fox	
Dr. Victoria Siebert	Side Effects	film	Open Road Films	Catherine Zeta-Jones
Dr. Violet Turner	Private Practice	TV series	ABC	
Dr. Will Zimmerman	Sanctuary	TV series	Syfy	Robin Dunne
Dr. William Haber	The Lathe of Heaven	novel	Ursula K. Le Guin	
Dr. Zachary Smith	Lost in Space	TV series	CBS	
Zack Busner	The Book of Dave	novel	Will Self	
Dr. James Whitman	The Psychiatrist	TV series	NBC	
Dr. Bernard Altman	The Psychiatrist	TV series	NBC	
Dr. Kathryn Railly	12 Monkeys	film	Universal Studios	Madeleine Stowe
Dr. Katharine Wyatt	Grey's Anatomy	TV series	ABC	Amy Madigan
Dr. Fletcher	12 Monkeys	film	Universal Studios	Frank Gorshin
Dr. Matt Lincoln	Matt Lincoln	TV series	ABC	
Dr. Molly Clock	Scrubs	TV series	NBC	Heather Graham
Dr. Sara Lynch	Conversations with the Devil	novel	Jeff Rovin	
Dr. Samuel Heller	Desperate Housewives	TV series	ABC	Stephen Spinella
Dr. Hannibal Lecter	The Silence of the Lambs and sequels	film	Universal Studios	
Dr. Robert (Bob) Hartley	The Bob Newhart Show	TV series	CBS	
R. Lars Porsena	Red Orc's Rage	novel	Philip José Farmer	
Dr. Emil Skoda	Law & Order; Law & Order: Special Victims Unit	TV series	NBC	J. K. Simmons
Dr. Sonia Wick	Girl, Interrupted	film	Columbia Pictures	Vanessa Redgrave
Dr. Harleen Frances Quinzel	various	various	DC Comics/DC Entertainment/DC Films	various
Dr. Helen Hartramph	Black Box	TV series	ABC	Vanessa Redgrave
Dr. Rintarō Hino	Dr. Rintarō	TV series	NTV	Masato Sakai
Dr. Ji Hae-soo	It's Okay, That's Love	TV series	SBS TV	Gong Hyo-jin
Dr. Lin Yi Chun	The World Between Us	TV series	PTS	Shih Ming-shuai
Dr. Ma Yi-sen	The World Between Us: After the Flames	TV series	PTS	Vic Chou

== Related lists ==
- List of psychiatrists
- List of psychologists
- List of psychiatric drugs
  - by condition treated
