= Fernand Meyssonnier =

French executioner (1931–2008)

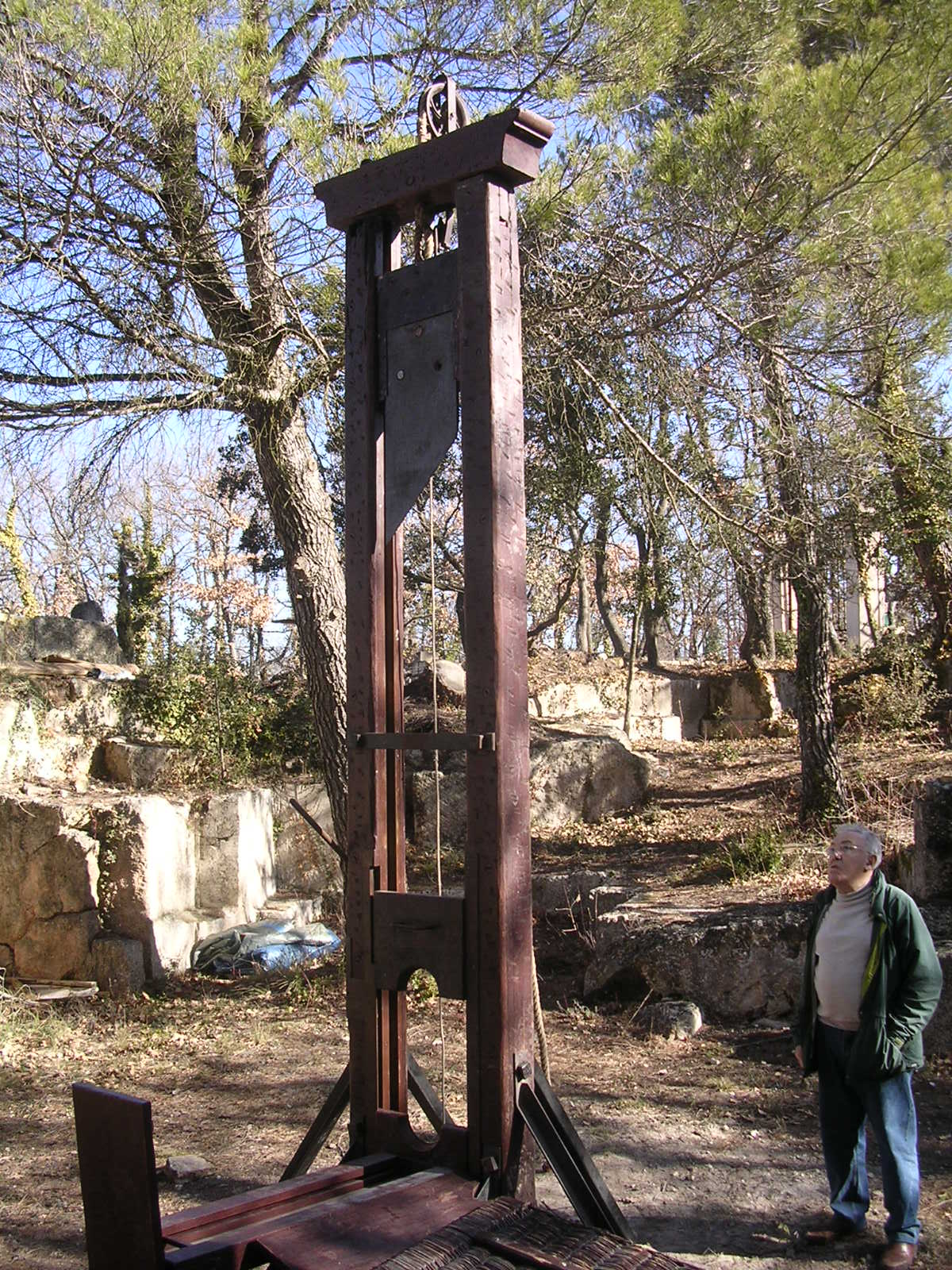
Meyssonnier standing next to a guillotine

Fernand Meyssonnier (1931–2008) was an executioner in the last years of French Algeria. He acted as an executioner from 1947 to 1961 and killed more than 200 people. He is the author of a book "The Executioner's Tale" (Paroles de bourreau : Témoignage unique d'un éxécuteur des arrêts criminels) answering questions about his career as an executioner.

He inherited the job of executioner from his father Maurice Meyssonnier in 1947 when he ended compulsory education. His ancestors had been executioners from ages ago. When Algeria became independent from France in 1961, the guillotine was replaced by execution by firing squad.

In 1961, shortly before Algerian independence, Fernand Meyssonnier went to Tahiti where he met his future wife with whom he had a daughter, and founded several businesses. After his retirement, he went to metropolitan France. He bought a house in Fontaine-de-Vaucluse where he died on August 8, 2008.

Meyssonnier had been erroneously called the "last (French) executioner alive". In fact, he died the same year as Marcel Chevalier, the last French chief executioner, who served from 1976 to 1977.

Government offices
Preceded by Maurice Meyssonnier	Acting Chief Executioner of the French Algeria; 1947 - 1961	Succeeded by Algeria became independent
