= Robert Evan Kendell =

British psychiatrist

Professor Robert Evan Kendell CBE FRSE FRCP FRCPE FRCPsych FMedSci

Chief Medical Officer of Scotland
- In office 1991–1996

Professor of Psychiatry, University of Edinburgh
- In office 1974–1991

Personal details
- Born: 28 March 1935 Yorkshire, England
- Died: 19 December 2002 (aged 67)
- Occupation: Psychiatrist

Robert Evan Kendell (28 March 1935 − 19 December 2002) was a British psychiatrist. He was Chief Medical Officer of Scotland from 1991 to 1996 and President of the Royal College of Psychiatrists from 1996 to 1999.

== Background ==
He was born on 28 March 1935 in Yorkshire, the son of teachers and spent some of his childhood in Wales. He was educated at the Mill Hill School in London then won a scholarship to Peterhouse, Cambridge, where he was awarded a Double First in the Natural Sciences Tripos. After further study at the King's College Hospital Medical School and a brief stint in internal medicine he joined the Maudsley Hospital and trained under Sir Aubrey Lewis. Kendell was later awarded the Gaskell Medal.

Aged 38 he was appointed to the chair of psychiatry in Edinburgh. In 1986 he was made the Dean of the Medical School and during his four years in this post he supervised a period of expansion. In 1991 he was appointed the Chief Medical Officer of Scotland. In 1997 he was elected the president of the Royal College of Psychiatrists and served for a three-year term. As Chief Medical Officer, he worked to build awareness of the influence of diet and smoking on health, as well as contributing to the responses to Bovine spongiform encephalopathy and HIV/AIDS.

== Research ==
He published more than 200 papers during his career, continuing after he had retired from employment. Much of his work focussed on the classification and diagnosis of mental disorders

== Awards and honours ==
He was made a Commander of the Order of the British Empire (CBE) in 2002. He was elected Fellow of the Royal Society of Edinburgh (FRSE). He was awarded the Paul Hoch Medal of the American Psychopathological Association; and the Marce Medal. He was a member of the World Health Organisation's Expert Advisory Panel on Mental Health for 12 years. In 1982 he was elected a member of the Harveian Society of Edinburgh and in 1984 he was elected a member of the Aesculapian Club.

== Death ==
On 19 December 2002 he collapsed and died later that day, of an unsuspected brain tumour.
