= Gail Eskes =

Canadian psychologist

Gail Eskes (born 1955) is a Canadian-American academic psychiatrist, and a professor of psychiatry at Dalhousie University.

== Career ==
Eskes received her Bachelor of Arts in psychology at the University of California, Berkeley in 1975. She earned a Doctor of Philosophy at the same university in 1981. She began her clinical training between 1993 and 2002 at Victoria General Hospital in Halifax, Nova Scotia.
