= Norman Kreitman =

Norman Kreitman (5 July 1927 – 15 December 2012) was a psychiatric researcher and academic, based in Edinburgh, primarily known for coining the term parasuicide. He was also a published poet of some distinction, and wrote perceptively on the philosophy of art - in particular, on the psychology of metaphor.

Kreitman was born in London. He received his medical training at Westminster Hospital, graduating in 1949, and worked at a tuberculosis hospital on the Isle of Wight before going into psychiatry. After training at the Maudsley hospital, he moved to Edinburgh in 1966.

In Edinburgh, he was Director of the Medical Research Council Unit for Epidemiological Studies in Psychiatry.

== Works ==
=== Psychiatry ===
- Methods of Psychiatric Research. Edited by Peter Sainsbury and Norman Kreitman. OUP. (1963)
- Current Research on Suicide and Parasuicide. (with S D Platt). Wiley. (1988)

=== Poetry ===
- Touching Rock (1987)
- Against Leviathan (1989)
- Casanova's 72nd Birthday (2003)
- Dancing in the Dark: New and Selected Poems (2010)
