= Stanley Palombo =

Stanley R. Palombo is a Washington, DC psychiatrist and psychoanalyst. Palombo is the author of Dreaming and Memory: A New Information-Processing Model and The Emergent Ego: Complexity and Coevolution in the Psychoanalytic Process.
