= Eurocare =

European non-governmental alliance campaigning against alcohol

Eurocare The European Alcohol Policy Alliance
- Founded: 1990; 36 years ago
- Type: Non-governmental organization
- Legal status: Alliance
- Purpose: Alcohol Prevention, Alcohol Awareness
- Location: Brussels, Belgium
- Services: Research and advocacy
- Secretary General: Mariann Skar
- President: Tiziana Codenotti
- Funding: Membership fees and volunteering and grants from the European Commission and the World Health Organization
- Website: www.eurocare.org

Eurocare (The European Alcohol Policy Alliance) is a network of some 50 voluntary and non-governmental organisations working on the prevention and reduction of alcohol-related harm across Europe. Its mission is to advocate for prevention of alcohol-related harm in Europe through effective evidence-based policy.

== History ==
Eurocare was founded in 1990. Starting with 9 member organizations in 1990, it now includes some 50 organisations. Eurocare has a Secretariat in Brussels, is democratically structured and is governed by a General Assembly. Eurocare organisations are involved in:

- Research and advocacy
- The provision of workplace and school based programs
- The provision of counselling services
- The provision of information to the public
- Residential support for problem drinkers

Eurocare is a member of the Global Alcohol Policy Alliance (GAPA) and the European Public Health Alliance (EPHA).

== Focus ==
Eurocare work focuses on raising awareness among European, national and regional decision makers on the harms caused by alcohol (social, health and economic burden) ensuring that these are taken into consideration in all relevant EU policy discussions. Eurocare believes that alcohol is a key health determinant responsible for 7.4% of all ill-health and early death in Europe and should not be treated just as any other marketable commodity. Eurocare considers that the means of alcohol production, distribution, consumption and control must be tackled at a European level and such action must be supportive of national control policies.

== Funding ==
Eurocare is supported through members’ contributions, both in membership fees and staff time. Additionally, Eurocare receives some funding from the European Commission and the WHO for various projects and publications. Eurocare does not accept any funding from the alcohol industry.

== Publications and Projects ==
Projects and publications include:

- The Trans Atlantic Civil Society Dialogue EU- USA
- PROTECT: Alcohol Labelling Policies to Protect Young People
- VINTAGE: Good Health into Older Age
- Pathways for Health
- FASE: Focus on Alcohol Safe Environment
- AMPHORA
- Bridging the Gap
- Building Capacity
- ELSA
- EUCAM
- PHEPA
