= Antoine Porot =

French psychiatrist

Antoine Porot (1876 in Chalon-sur-Saône – 1965) was a French psychiatrist. He founded what was known as the Algiers School of psychiatry, which attempted to justify the inherent racism in the French colonial mission in Algiers on the basis that Algerians, i.e. the Muslim non-ethnically French inhabitants, were biologically inferior. Frantz Fanon discusses his theories and the impact on Algerian colonial society in his book, The Wretched of the Earth, but does not reference Porot by name in any of his published writings (except for an unsigned piece in anti-colonial magazine Consciences maghrébines).

Porot had a son, Maurice Porot (born 1912), who followed in his father's footsteps, becoming a psychiatrist, teaching at Alger (1958-1962) then at Clermont-Ferrand (1965-1982).

== Psychiatric Philosophy ==
Porot portrayed himself as interested in understanding Algerian society. His assessment of it was that Algerian Muslims were hysterical, unintelligent, and innately more likely to be criminals. He also noted that Algerian criminals were relatively more likely to refuse to confess despite clear evidence of their guilt, and concluded that they had an ingrained inability to tell the difference between truth and falsehoods.

His philosophy was influenced by Arthur de Gobineau, who perpetuated white supremacy by claiming that racism was scientifically justified by biological differences between races.

== Effects of the Algiers School of Psychiatry ==
In his 2006 book, La Dignité: les debouts de l'utopie, Bernard Doray discusses the eugenics-justified liquidation of some 40,000 inmates of French mental wards and hospitals under the Nazi Occupation of World War II. He says that the order for the extermination did not originate from any one person or authority; it grew almost spontaneously from "an accumulation of interstitial abominations", chiefly based on "indigenous psychiatry", of which Antoine Porot was the ultimate source:

"It is however in the colonial situations that the poison of the integrism of the gene has found more durably its ground of election. Thus, in French Algeria, until the 1950s, the school of racist psychiatry called "Algiers" developed. The real inspiration was Antoine Porot, who, let us emphasize it in passing, wrote at that time works crossed with Dr. Angelo Hesnard, sometimes hailed as the introducer of psychoanalysis in France (he had an exchange of letters with Freud since 1912), and as a part of a biological psychoanalysis that still deserves a detour.
Antoine Porot had an intellectual heir to his blood, Maurice Porot, and also pupils. Pierson thus introduced the "concept" of "reactive paleophrenia" to account for "the morbid impulse in a North African environment" (in this race of men, it is the reptilian brain that commands, particularly in situations of violence...). There was also Arii, with whom Porot Senior published an article on criminal impulsivity in the Algerian native, inspired by this student's thesis. This article was a mandatory reference for the edification of the youngest: Jean Sutter and Bardenat, to name those who left searchable writings.
The idea that runs through these so-called scientific works is monotonous: the notorious impulsiveness of "the native" is the demonstration of a biological defect attached to his race, which is devoid of a cortex as soft as that of the proud European brain. In the end, these psychiatrists, who often afterwards achieved good academic careers and formed a politico-professional pressure group, influential in France until the end of the 1980s, had sought to give "scientific" arguments not only to justify the status of sub-citizenship applied to "Muslims", but also to legitimize an armed repression of emancipatory aspirations, a repression that began well before the first fires of the Algerian revolution. This racist psychiatry was also a mercenary psychiatry."
