= Psychiatric Times =

- Discipline: Clinical Psychiatry
- Language: English
- Edited by: John J. Miller

Publication details
- History: 1985–present
- Publisher: MJH Life Sciences (United States)
- Frequency: Monthly

Standard abbreviations
- ISO 4: Psychiatr. Times

Indexing
- ISSN: 0893-2905
- OCLC no.: 53834993

Links
- Journal homepage; Online archive

Psychiatric Times is a peer-reviewed medical trade publication written for an audience involved in the profession of psychiatry. It is published monthly by MJH Associates and is distributed to about 50,000 psychiatrists monthly. The download of the journal is free of charge.

== History ==
The periodical was first published in January 1985 as a 16-page bimonthly publication. It was founded by psychiatrist John L. Schwartz and originally edited by Ronald Pies. The current editor-in-chief is John J. Miller.
