= Sports psychiatry =

Branch of medicine

Sports psychiatry is a medical specialty that aims to treat and prevent mental disorders in athletes and helps them use different techniques to enhance their performance. First mentioned in literature in 1967, it is a developing area that relies on other fields, like sports psychology.

== History ==
The first publication on sports psychiatry was written in 1967 by Arnold R Beisser, a doctor and tennis player. It was brought up in literature again twenty years later by JH Rick Massimino, MD, and mentioned again in 1992 by California-based psychiatrist Daniel Begel, who is known for officially launching the specialty. As the field developed, the World Psychiatric Association eventually created a section on Exercise and Sports Psychiatry, giving way for interest in other countries, including Britain and Germany.

=== International Society for Sports Psychiatry ===
Founded in 1994 by Dan Begel, the International Society for Sports Psychiatry (ISSP) is a global leader in promoting mental health and well-being in athletes of all ages, abilities and backgrounds. Through education, advocacy, and collaboration, the ISSP advances the field of sports psychiatry, ensuring athletes have the resources they need to thrive. Leaders of the ISSP have developed and continue to refine world-class courses and curricula for mental health in sports, author seminal papers/books, provide mentorship for developing sports psychiatrists, and continue to lead global coalitions in sports psychiatry. The organization aims to spread the benefits of the field to the entire athletic community and promote mental health in sports.

In 2020, ISSP membership was open to medical students, residents, psychiatrists, and other clinicians, and the organization collaborated with national and international partners to advance sports psychiatry.

The ISSP has partnered with the Swiss Society for Sport Psychiatry and Psychology to advance the Journal of Sports and Exercise Psychiatry.

=== American Board of Sports & Performance Psychiatry ===
In 2023, seven sports psychiatrists founded the American Board of Sports & Performance Psychiatry: Brook Choulet, MD; Mark Allen, MD; Thomas Horn, DO; Amanda Klass, DO; Rolando Gonzalez, MD; Tia Konzer, DO; Ankur Desai, MD. Their mission is to credential sports and performance psychiatrists who demonstrate excellence in the comprehensive care of athletes and performers, fostering mental well-being and optimal performance. Through the certification of board-certified sports and performance psychiatrists, the ABSPP aim to enhance the mental health and well-being of athletes, performers, executives, and individuals striving for peak performance in their personal and professional lives.

== Requirements ==
Sports psychiatry positions often require specific experience in sports medicine, as well as a master's degree in clinical psychology, counseling, or sports psychiatry especially. However, in addition to that, they must be aware of individual and team culture as well as approach the prescription of medication with a perspective on doping in sports.

=== Professional differences ===
Differences between sports psychologists and psychiatrists, according to Antonia Baum, are that although both areas aim to enhance athletes' performance, psychiatry also focuses on psychopathology and tries to uncover deeper issues than performance problems. Additionally, psychiatrists are able to prescribe psychotropic medication.

== Common areas of study ==
Some of the most commonly found mental disorders in athletes that sports psychiatrists may come in contact with include mood disorders (such as major depressive disorder, bipolar disorder), anxiety disorders (including social anxiety disorder, obsessive-compulsive disorder, eating disorders, attention deficit hyperactivity disorder (ADHD), and substance abuse), and more sport-specific ones such as concussions, body dysmorphic disorder, traumatic brain injuries (TBI), and chronic traumatic encephalopathy (CTE).

Eating and body dysmorphic disorders have higher incidence in women in sports that emphasize appearance, like gymnastics or figure skating. Substance abuse is commonly found in the athletic community. College athletes have been reported to use alcohol at higher levels than the general public despite its detriment to performance. Anabolic steroids are also a widely abused substance among athletes. These aid athletes in faster training and recovery time, but may also have psychiatric side effects like irritability and mood swings. Substance abuse is a concern among elite athletes.

== Commonly used techniques ==
The treatments of choice for many mental illnesses experienced by athletes include psychotropic medication as well as, depending on the specific situation and life of the athlete, psychotherapy, psychoeducation, counseling, and family therapy.

=== Psychotropic medication ===
Usually, sports psychiatrists choose non-sedating medications because they are less likely to cause side effects such as an increase in weight and body fat, sedentary behavior, a decrease in insulin sensitivity, cardiac issues. The effect on athletes' performance must also be taken into consideration, as well the anti-doping guidelines of different sports leagues. The World Anti-Doping Agency (WADA) provides a list of generally banned substances, and it is left to each leagues' discretion to add a more strict code.

Widely used medications include antidepressants (e.g. bupropion), mood stabilizers, anticonvulsants (e.g. lithium), anxiolytics (e.g. benzodiazepines), Psychostimulants/ADHD medications (e.g. dextroamphetamine), and sometimes sedative hypnotics and antipsychotics.

=== Prevention and Youth Applications ===
Preventative approaches in sports psychiatry increasingly emphasize early intervention with children and adolescents in schools and community settings. Participation in structured physical activity has long been associated with improved emotional well-being and social functioning, and resilience, making sport a potential medium for mental health promotion prior to the onset of psychiatric disorders.

Sport-based therapy integrates evidence-informed therapeutic practices with organized sport and movement to address emotional regulation, social functioning, and mental health outcomes. School-based research has examined sports-based group therapy as a trauma-informed intervention for youth exposed to adverse experiences. A mixed-methods study of elementary school students receiving services reported symptom reduction for a majority of participants and suggested the approach may increase access to care while reducing stigma associated with traditional counseling.

Programs delivering sport-based therapy are often implemented by interdisciplinary teams of clinicians and coaches in school and community settings. Organizations specializing in this approach have been described as leaders in integrating mental health treatment with sport participation for youth, with clinician Rebekah Roulier, LMHC and non-profit executive David Cohen associated with program development and implementation for this innovation.

== Mental health stigma ==
Mental health is a common problem, with three hundred and twenty-two million people living with depression worldwide, according to the World Health Organization in 2015. Athletes appear to have similar levels of mental health problems to the rest of the population. However, they often face certain barriers in seeking mental health care, which can make their mental health issues more severe. The most challenging barrier that athletes face is the mental health stigma prevalent in the sports community. Professions such as sports psychiatry provide athletes with outlets and solutions to their mental health issues. Therefore, an important role for sports psychiatrists is to help de-stigmatize and promote mental health among athletes.

What is a stigma?

A stigma is a negative perception that is associated with an individual, group of people, circumstance, or specific trait. Erving Goffman, a well-known sociologist and social psychologist, explained that stigma occurs when what a person should be does not equate to what they perceive themselves to be. Goffman used stigma to describe the situations where one is not given respect due to them not fulfilling the role they are supposed to in whichever circumstance they are in. Goffman did this by creating two different groups of people: Those who attain what they ought to be are "normals", and those who do not are the "stigmatized". In the context of sports, those who do not have mental health issues would be the "normals", and those who do experience mental health disorders would potentially be "stigmatized".

Mental health stigma in sports

In the sports world, it is often assumed athletes have the ideal mental toughness that allows them to be successful in their sport. Therefore, when an athlete has a mental health issue, they can see this as a contradiction to the mental fortitude they are supposed to maintain. This is where the mental health stigma arises: When what athletes feel internally contradicts what they are expected to portray externally. The concern for not being respected by coaches, teammates, and even family members can lead an athlete to not seek the mental health care that they need. Athletes often believe this lack of respect will come from them not fulfilling the role they are meant to fulfill when they have a mental health problem.

Examples of mental health stigma

· Natasha Danvers is a retired, British track and field athlete who has won Olympic medals. She had consistent mental health issues and attempted to commit suicide in 2011. Later on, Natasha explained that the sport she played created an environment where she was supposed to be able to handle tough situations by herself. Due to this, it was hard for her to admit she had mental health issues, which she described as a "weakness".

· Michael Phelps is an American swimmer with the most Olympic medals of all time, winning a total of twenty-eight. Phelps struggled with mental health issues and experienced suicidal thoughts. Michael explained that he was under the impression it was a sign of weakness to ask for help. In the sports world, asking for help reduces the mentally strong image athletes are supposed to maintain.

· American baseball player Rick Ankiel had anxiety issues which forced him to retire. He explained the stigma around mental health in athletics, and how it negatively affected him. Rick provided an example of this stigma when he mentioned people on social media accusing him of being weak and lacking mental toughness.

· American professional tennis player Mardy Fish had a cardiac arrest which caused him to have a serious anxiety disorder. Mardy discussed that athletes are taught to have mental toughness and that showing weakness, such as anxiety issues, is unworthy behavior in the sports world.

== See also ==
- Sports medicine
