= Royal College of Psychiatrists =

Professional organisation of psychiatrists in the United Kingdom

- Formation: 1841; 185 years ago
- Headquarters: Prescot Street, London, England
- Region served: United Kingdom
- President: Subodh Dave
- Affiliations: Academy of Medical Royal Colleges
- Website: www.rcpsych.ac.uk

The Royal College of Psychiatrists is the main professional organisation of psychiatrists in the United Kingdom, and is responsible for representing psychiatrists, for psychiatric research and for providing public information about mental health problems. The college provides advice to those responsible for training and certifying psychiatrists in the UK.

In addition to publishing many books and producing several journals, the college produces, for the public, information about mental health problems. Its offices are located at 21 Prescot Street in London, near Aldgate. The college's previous address (until 2013) was in Belgrave Square.

== History ==
The college has existed in various forms since 1841, having started as the Association of Medical Officers of Asylums and Hospitals for the Insane. In 1865 it became the Medico-Psychological Association. In 1926, the association received its royal charter, becoming the Royal Medico-Psychological Association. In 1971, a supplemental charter gave the association the name of the Royal College of Psychiatrists.

Eleanora Fleury became the first female member of the Medico Psychological Association in 1894, when she was elected by 23 votes to 7. She remained a member until 1924. This made her the first woman psychiatrist in Ireland or Great Britain.

== Coat of arms ==
The coat of arms incorporates the traditional serpent-entwined Rod of Asclepius symbolic of medicine, and butterflies associated with Psyche. Previous to the grant of these arms, the Medico-Psychological Association had used a device showing the seated Psyche with butterfly's wings. The arms were originally granted to the Royal Medico-Psychological Association in 1926, and were confirmed to the college on its formation in 1971 by the College of Arms. They were also registered in Scotland by the Court of the Lord Lyon.

Coat of arms of Royal College of Psychiatrists

Notes
Confirmed by the Lyon Court 21 November 1972.
Crest
A looped cross Or between two wings Sable.
Escutcheon
Or a staff of Aesculapius Gules within a bordure Sable charged with four butterflies of the field.
Supporters
On either side a serpent Or langued Gules.

== Policy and campaigns ==
The college runs various campaigns. Its "Choose Psychiatry" campaign has helped to increase the fill rate of posts from 78% in 2018 to 100% in 2020. The college has called for parity in the funding of mental health services.

On assisted dying, the college's policy is neutral on the principles involved but was critical of some of the specific proposals in the Terminally Ill Adults (End of Life) Bill proposed in 2025.

== List of presidents ==
The president is elected for a three-year term and serves as head of the Royal College of Psychiatrists.

- Martin Roth (1971 to 1975)
- Linford Rees (1975 to 1978)
- Desmond Pond (1978 to 1981)
- Kenneth Rawnsley (1981 to 1984)
- Thomas Bewley (1984 to 1987)
- James Leatham Tennant Birley (1987 to 1990)
- Andrew Sims (1990 to 1993)
- Fiona Caldicott (1993 to 1996); first female president
- Robert Evan Kendell (1996 to 1999)
- John Cox (1999 to 2002)
- Mike Shooter (2002 to 2005)
- Sheila Hollins (2005 to 2008)
- Dinesh Bhugra (2008 to 2011)
- Dame Susan Bailey (2011 to 2014)
- Sir Simon Wessely (2014 to 2017)
- Wendy Burn (2017 to 2020)
- Adrian James (2020 to 2023)
- Lade Smith (2023 to 2026)
- Subodh Dave (2026 - )

== See also ==
- Academy of Medical Royal Colleges
- American Psychiatric Association
- List of psychiatrists
- Royal College of Physicians
- Mental health in the United Kingdom
