= Forensic psychotherapy =

Psychological treatment of violent offenders

Forensic psychotherapy is the application of psychological knowledge to the treatment of offender-patients who commit violent acts against themselves or others. This form of treatment allows for a therapist to potentially understand the offender and their mental state. It gives the individual providing treatment the opportunity to examine further whether the offender's criminal behavior was a conscious act or not, what exactly their association with violent behavior is, and what possible motives could have driven them. The discipline of forensic psychotherapy is one that requires the involvement of individuals other than simply the therapist and patient. A therapist may collaborate with other professionals, such as physicians, social workers, nurses and other psychologists in order to best serve the offenders’ needs. Whether the treatment is successful or not relies on a multitude of things, but typically ensuring that a systemic approach is taken and that all involved in the treatment process are well informed and supportive has proven to be the most effective. In addition to group work forensic psychotherapy may also involve therapeutic communities, individual interaction with victims as well as offenders, and family work. In order for this specialized therapy to be as effective as possible, it demands the compliance of not only the patient and therapist, but of the rest of society as well. The main focus of forensic psychotherapy is not to condone the acts of the offender, but to obtain a psychodynamic understanding of the offender in order to attempt to provide them with an effective form of treatment to help them take responsibility for any crimes committed and to prevent the perpetration of crimes by the offender in the future. Guidelines have been set to ensure proficiency in the field of Forensic Psychology.

== Controversy regarding treatment ==
It has been difficult to illustrate a clear link between psychological interventions and the successful reduction of offenses. Nothing has brought about the complete eradication of crime in patients being treated using this practice. At times this difficulty has contributed to a profound pessimism about the effectiveness of any form of treatment. This began in the United States of America, but pessimism regarding the effectiveness of treatment soon spread to the United Kingdom. This was said to have adversely affected the provision of rehabilitative treatments. The development of cognitive behavioral therapy made it possible to demonstrate an effect upon some attitudes and offending behaviors. These behaviors being measured in controlled research studies led to the introduction of structured treatment programs in prisons across Canada, the United States, the United Kingdom and more recently, mainland Europe. For a period of time, there have been positive benefits in the provision of resources, particularly in prison settings. However, there has been serious conflict as professionals continue to compete for limited resources and one model claimed superiority over another.

It has remained difficult to establish with great certainty which methods, if any, are effective over a significant period of time. However, psychodynamic forensic psychotherapy has been shown to have some successful impact, as have Therapeutic Communities.

== Role of forensic psychologists ==
Forensic psychology conceptualizes both the criminal and civil sides of the justice system, while simultaneously encompassing the clinical and experimental aspects of psychology. Forensic psychologists can receive training as either clinical psychologists or experimental psychologists, and will generally have one primary role in terms of employment. A large portion of forensic psychologists are treatment providers, who evaluate and provide some sort of psychological treatment or intervention. However, many individuals in this field engage in other roles that are more related to their specific interests and/or training. These secondary roles are often involved with the criminal justice system- for example, forensic psychologists often will step in as an expert witness, being called upon to testify in court about a topic in which they have a specialized knowledge. Forensic Psychologists often assume the role of evaluators, typically being asked to evaluate a criminal defendant's mental state. This is done in order to determine factors such as whether or not the defendant is competent to stand trial, if the defendant would be a future risk factor, and what the defendant's mental state was like at the time in which they committed the alleged offense. Much of the time, once an assessment has been made by the forensic psychologist, they are then asked to testify in court as an expert witness about their findings. Areas of concern include potential risk and confidentiality.

== Settings ==
There are many different settings in which a forensic psychologist may work. An individual that has specialized knowledge in regards to mental health, as well as the legal system, proves to be a vital asset for the courts and the criminal justice system. Many forensic psychologists spend a significant portion of time working in legal settings, but there are a lot of other locations in which a forensic psychologist can receive training to work at. Police departments, research centers, hospitals, medical examiners offices and universities are also settings in which forensic psychologists are often employed. Community settings are settings in which patients are managed by community forensic teams.

== Forensic psychotherapy ==
The aim of forensic psychotherapy is not only to understand the crime an individual has committed, but to understand the person as a whole within his/her environment. Forensic psychotherapy may involve group work, individual work, work with victims, and work with families, as well as within therapeutic communities.

Working from the premise that the offender has a complex internal world which may be characterized by punitive and unreliable internal representations of paternal and other figures, psychotherapy can shed light on the unconscious impulses, conflicts, and primitive defense mechanisms, involved in his or her destructive actions and "acting out". It helps to understand the triggers to the violent acts and timing of the acts. Forensic psychotherapy aims to help the offender understand why they committed the act and take responsibility for it, aiming to prevent future crimes committed.

The intimacy and profound experience of therapy may enable an offender to reframe and restructure these harsh images which tend to blunt sensitivities and, when projected out onto others, act as a rationale or driving force for criminal acting out. The patient may develop self-awareness, and an awareness of the nature of their deeds, and ultimately be able to live a more adjusted life. The effectiveness of psychodynamic psychotherapy, as is the case with other psychological therapies, is limited far as behavioral change for antisocial personality or psychopathic offenders. These two types of offenders comprise the primary diagnostic group found in forensic psychotherapy work. The evidence which is emerging, suggests that a range and variety of treatments may be most helpful for such offenders.

Treatment of high risk offenders poses particular problems of perverse transference and counter transference which can undermine and confound effective treatment so it would be usual to expect such treatment to be conducted by experienced practitioners who are well supported and supervised.

== Controversy regarding the application of forensic psychotherapy ==
There have also been some controversies regarding the application of forensic psychotherapy within courts and its use during or after trials. Among clinicians there are prejudices that judges see the analysis of unconscious motivations as simply adminshing the guilt of the offender and as a means of working around legal systems. Because of the scenarios in which forensic psychotherapy is utilized oftentimes the patient-offender will face punishment for their crimes just as they are prepared to undergo proper treatment. The success of forensic psychotherapy could likely result in this, leading to many patients not receiving full treatment.

Another controversy that affects the development of forensic psychotherapy is the publics perception of an offender, especially those involved in serious crimes like pedophilia. It's common for trial outcomes to be viewed as black and white, the victim is good and the perpetrator is bad. Because of this preconception any treatment for the perpetrator is generally looked down upon. It is not an uncommon occurrence that people who were once victims may later on become perpetrators. Another important fact to consider is that in the vast majority of child abuse cases the primary offender is either the victims family or close friends of the family. When forensic psychotherapists attempt to determine what causes in an offenders past could have led to their motivations for perpetrating a crime they could be met with public scrutiny for appearing to sympathize with the offender.

== Guidelines for forensic psychotherapy ==
In 1931, a group of individuals who established the Association for the Scientific Treatment of Delinquency and Crime developed Forensic Therapy at the Portman Clinic in London. Determined to influence and enhance the understanding of this method of treatment, the International Association for Forensic Psychotherapy (IAFP) was formed in June 1991 and is still active today. The main function of this association is to advance the understanding people have of forensic psychotherapy, including the forms of treatment and risk factors associated with this practice. This helps to promote the health of not only offenders, but of victims as well. The American Academy for Forensic Psychology and the American Psychology-Law Society published the Speciality Guidelines for Forensic Psychologists in 1991. It provides direction to forensic psychologists in identifying competent practice, practicing responsibly, establishing relationships with parties involved and identifying issues. APA also created guidelines in the 1990s for new forensic psychologists. In 1994 the Guidelines for Child Custody Evaluations in Divorce Proceedings was adopted by the APA Council of Representatives to promote proficiency. In 1998 the Guidelines for Psychological Evaluations in Child Protection Matters was adopted by the APA Council of Representatives as well.

Certification is done statewide and nationwide to ensure competence. More classes are being offered in Forensic Psychology and more opportunities are available at the graduate and post graduate level.
