= Psychiatrist =

Physician who specializes in psychiatry

Occupation
- Names: Psychiatrist; alienist (archaic)
- Occupation type: Profession; specialization
- Activity sectors: Medicine; psychiatry

Description
- Competencies: Analytical mind; patience
- Education required: Doctor of Medicine (M.D.); Doctor of Osteopathic Medicine (D.O.); Bachelor of Medicine, Bachelor of Surgery (MBBS/MBChB)
- Fields of employment: Psychiatric clinics
- Related jobs: Psychologist; psychotherapist; Psychiatric-mental health nurse practitioner

A psychiatrist is a physician who specializes in psychiatry. Psychiatrists evaluate patients to determine whether their symptoms are the result of a physical illness, a combination of physical and mental ailments, or strict mental issues. A psychiatrist sometimes works within a multidisciplinary team, which may comprise clinical psychologists, social workers, occupational therapists, and nursing staff. Psychiatrists have broad training in a biopsychosocial approach to the assessment and management of mental illness.

As part of the clinical assessment process, psychiatrists may employ a mental status examination; a physical examination; brain imaging such as a computerized tomography, magnetic resonance imaging, or positron emission tomography scan; and blood testing. Psychiatrists use pharmacologic, psychotherapeutic, or interventional approaches to treat mental disorders.

== Subspecialties ==
The field of psychiatry has many subspecialties that require additional (fellowship) training, which, in the US, are certified by the American Board of Psychiatry and Neurology (ABPN) and require the Maintenance of Certification Program to continue. These include the following:

- Clinical neurophysiology
- Forensic psychiatry
- Addiction psychiatry
- Child and adolescent psychiatry
- Geriatric psychiatry
- Palliative care
- Pain management
- Consultation-liaison psychiatry
- Sleep medicine
- Brain injury medicine

Further, other specialties that exist include:

- Cross-cultural psychiatry
- Emergency psychiatry
- Learning disability
- Neurodevelopmental disorder
- Cognition diseases, as in various forms of dementia
- Biological psychiatry
- Community psychiatry
- Global mental health
- Military psychiatry
- Social psychiatry
- Sports psychiatry

The United Council for Neurologic Subspecialties in the United States offers certification and fellowship program accreditation in the subspecialties of behavioral neurology and neuropsychiatry, which is open to both neurologists and psychiatrists.

Some psychiatrists specialize in helping certain age groups. Pediatric psychiatry is the area of the profession working with children in addressing psychological problems. Psychiatrists specializing in geriatric psychiatry work with the elderly and are called geriatric psychiatrists or geropsychiatrists. Those who practice psychiatry in the workplace are called occupational psychiatrists in the United States and occupational psychology is the name used for the most similar discipline in the UK. Psychiatrists working in the courtroom and reporting to the judge and jury, in both criminal and civil court cases, are called forensic psychiatrists, who also treat mentally disordered offenders and other patients whose condition is such that they have to be treated in secure units.

Other psychiatrists may also specialize in psychopharmacology, psychotherapy, psychiatric genetics, neuroimaging, dementia-related disorders such as Alzheimer's disease, attention deficit hyperactivity disorder, sleep medicine, pain medicine, palliative medicine, eating disorders, sexual disorders, women's health, global mental health, early psychosis intervention, mood disorders and anxiety disorders such as obsessive–compulsive disorder and post-traumatic stress disorder.

Psychiatrists work in a wide variety of settings. Some are full-time medical researchers, many see patients in private medical practices, and consult liaison psychiatrists see patients in hospital settings where psychiatric and other medical conditions interact.

As a physician (M.D. or D.O.), a psychiatrist specializes in diagnosing, treating, and preventing mental, emotional, and behavioral disorders, and is qualified to prescribe medications and order a medical and laboratory tests to assess the physical aspects of psychological problems.

== Professional requirements ==
While requirements to become a psychiatric physician differ from country to country, all require a medical degree.

=== India ===
In India, a Bachelor of Medicine, Bachelor of Surgery (MBBS) degree is the basic qualification needed to do psychiatry. After completing an MBBS (including an internship), they can attend various PG medical entrance exams and get a Doctor of Medicine (M.D.) in psychiatry, which is a 3-year course. A diploma course in psychiatry or DNB psychiatry can also be taken to become a psychiatrist.

=== Netherlands ===
In the Netherlands, becoming a psychiatrist requires completing medical school to be certified as a medical doctor . Subsequently, and generally only after several years of post-graduate work experience as an ANIOS, and after a competitive selection, a physician may enter the 4.5-year postgraduate residency program (become an AIOS) to specialize in psychiatry. The total path to becoming a registered psychiatrist in the Netherlands, therefore, takes a minimum of 10.5 years, comprising 6 years of medical school Medical school#Belgium and Netherlands followed by the 4.5-year residency, but is generally substantially longer.

Postgraduate training in psychiatry is regulated by the Dutch Association for Psychiatry (NVvP) in accordance with the rules of the College of Medical Specialties (CGS), part of the Royal Dutch Medical Association (RDMA).

According to the National Training Plan for Psychiatry (Landelijk Opleidingsplan de Psychiater) updated in October 2023, key requirements of the residency include:

- Settings: Residents must gain experience in both a Mental Health Institute (GGZ) and a general or academic hospital.
- Lifespan Context: Training covers the entire lifespan, divided into three contexts: Child and Adolescent (0–23 years), Adult (16–65 years), and Elderly (60+ years).
- Profiling (Electives): A total of 18 months is dedicated to profiling. During this period, residents can choose to focus on specific age groups, treatment contexts, or academic themes.
- Psychotherapy: Residents must perform at least 200 sessions of psychotherapy, including three process-oriented therapies and one group or system therapy. This is supported by 120 hours of supervision plus a minimum of 50 sessions of personal therapy (leertherapie) focused on the resident's own professional reflection and growth.

(In the Netherlands, a distinction is made between arts in opleiding tot specialist (AIOS) and arts niet in opleiding tot specialist (ANIOS). Both are fully qualified physicians (basisartsen) who have completed medical school and are licensed to practice. However, an AIOS does hold a formal position within a recognized postgraduate training program leading to a medical specialty, whereas an ANIOS works as a physician without (yet) being enrolled in such a program, often to gain clinical experience before entering specialist training. )

For further reading (contains some obsolete information): Ten Doesschate, R.J.A., & Hodiamont, P.P.G. (2007). Mental health in the Netherlands. International psychiatry: bulletin of the Board of International Affairs of the Royal College of Psychiatrists, 4(2), 39–41.

=== Pakistan ===
In Pakistan, one must complete basic medical education, an MBBS, then get registered with the Pakistan Medical and Dental Council (PMDC) as a general practitioner after a one-year mandatory internship, house job. After registration with PMDC, one has to take the FCPS-I exam. After that, they pursue four additional years of training in psychiatry at the College of Physicians and Surgeons Pakistan. Training inclu des rotations in general medicine, neurology, and clinical psychology for three months each, during the first two years. There is a mid-exam intermediate module and a final exam after four years.

=== Hong Kong ===
In the Hong Kong Special Administrative Region (HKSAR), psychiatrists are required to obtain a medical degree, followed by a minimum of six years of specialized training. Then, they must achieve fellowship at the Hong Kong College of Psychiatrists and attain the qualification of 'specialist in psychiatry' from the Medical Council. Certified psychiatrists are included in the registry.

The fees charged by specialist psychiatrists vary. In private clinics, the cost of a consultation starts from HK$1,500. Compared to private clinics, the fees for specialist outpatient services of the Hospital Authority are lower, but the waiting time can be as long as two years. For Eligible Persons, the first consultation fee is HK$135, and each subsequent consultation fee is HK$80. Additionally, the cost for each type of medication is HK$15.

=== United Kingdom and Ireland ===
In the United Kingdom, psychiatrists must hold a medical degree. Following this, the individual will work as a foundation house officer for two additional years in the UK, or one year as an intern in Ireland to achieve registration as a basic medical practitioner. Training in psychiatry can then begin, and it is taken in two parts: three years of basic specialist training culminating in the MRCPsych exam, followed by three years of higher specialist training referred to as "ST4-6" in the UK and "Senior Registrar Training" in Ireland. Candidates with an MRCPsych degree and complete basic training must reinterview for higher specialist training. At this stage, the development of special interests such as forensic or child/adolescent takes place. At the end of 3 years of higher specialist training, candidates are awarded a Certificate of Completion of (Specialist) Training (CC(S)T). At this stage, the psychiatrist can register as a specialist, and the qualification of CC(S)T is recognized in all EU/EEA states. As such, training in the UK and Ireland is considerably longer than in the US or Canada and frequently takes around 8–9 years following graduation from medical school. Those with a CC(S)T will be able to apply for consultant posts. Those with training from outside the EU/EEA should consult local/native medical boards to review their qualifications and eligibility for equivalence recognition (for example, those with a US residency and ABPN qualification).

=== United States and Canada ===
In the United States and Canada, one must first attain the degree of M.D. or Doctor of Osteopathic Medicine, followed by practice as a psychiatric resident for another four years (five years in Canada). This extended period involves comprehensive training in psychiatric diagnosis, psychopharmacology, medical care issues, and psychotherapies. All accredited psychiatry residencies in the United States require proficiency in cognitive behavioral, brief, psychodynamic, and supportive psychotherapies. Psychiatry residents are required to complete at least four post-graduate months of internal medicine or pediatrics, plus a minimum of two months of neurology during their first year of residency, referred to as an "internship". After completing their training, psychiatrists are eligible to take a specialty board examination to become board-certified. The total amount of time required to complete educational and training requirements in the field of psychiatry in the United States is twelve years after high school. Subspecialists in child and adolescent psychiatry are required to complete a two-year fellowship program, the first year of which can run concurrently with the fourth year of the general psychiatry residency program. This adds one to two years of training. The average compensation for psychiatrists in the U.S. in 2023 was $309,000.

== See also ==
- List of psychiatrists
- List of fictional psychiatrists
- Psychiatry
- Antipsychiatry
