= Leadership =

Quality of an individual or group influencing or guiding others

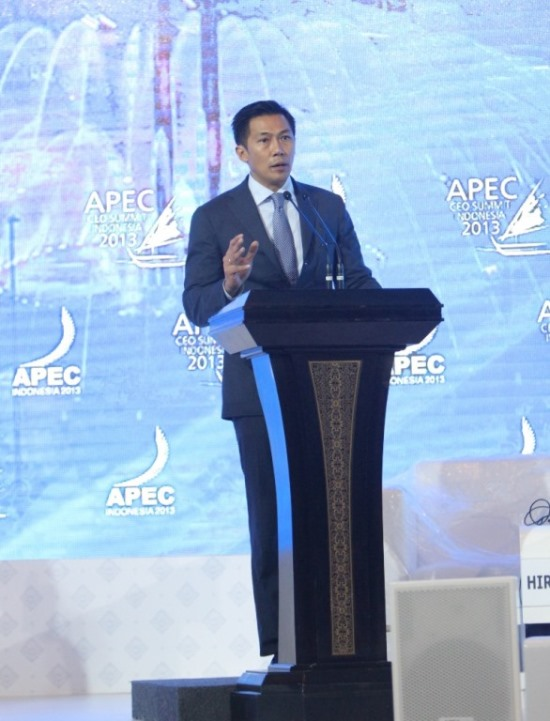
An APEC leader setting the tone for the 2013 APEC CEO summit with an opening speech

Leadership is the ability of an individual, group, or organization to influence, or guide other individuals, teams, or organizations. Leadership is a contested term. Specialist literature debates various viewpoints on the concept, sometimes contrasting Eastern and Western approaches to leadership, and also (within the West) North American versus European approaches.

Some U.S. academic environments define leadership as "a process of social influence in which a person can enlist the aid and support of others in the accomplishment of a common and ethical task". In other words, leadership is an influential power-relationship in which the power of one party (the "leader") promotes movement/change in others (the "followers"). Some have challenged the more traditional managerial views of leadership (which portray leadership as something possessed or owned by one individual due to their role or authority), and instead advocate the complex nature of leadership which is found at all levels of institutions, both within formal and informal roles.

Studies of leadership have produced theories involving (for example) traits, complexity, collective intelligence, situational interaction, function, behavior, power, vision, values, charisma, and intelligence, among others.

== Historical views ==
The Chinese doctrine of the Mandate of Heaven postulated the need for rulers to govern justly, and the right of subordinates to overthrow emperors who appeared to lack divine sanction.

Pro-aristocracy thinkers have postulated that leadership depends on one's "blue blood" or genes. Monarchy takes an extreme view of the same idea, and may prop up its assertions against the claims of mere aristocrats by invoking divine sanction (see the divine right of kings). On the other hand, more democratically inclined theorists have pointed to examples of meritocratic leaders, such as the Napoleonic marshals profiting from careers open to talent.

In the autocratic/paternalistic strain of thought, traditionalists recall the role of leadership of the Roman pater familias. Feminist thinking, on the other hand, may object to such models as patriarchal and may posit against them "emotionally attuned, responsive, and consensual empathetic guidance, which is sometimes associated with matriarchies".

Comparable to the Roman tradition, the views of Confucianism on 'right living' relate very much to the ideal of the (male) scholar-leader and his benevolent rule, buttressed by a tradition of filial piety.

— P.K. Saxena

Leadership is a matter of intelligence, trustworthiness, humaneness, courage, and discipline. Reliance on intelligence alone results in rebelliousness. The exercise of humaneness alone results in weakness. Fixation on trust leads to folly. Dependence on the strength of courage results in violence. Excessive discipline and sternness in command result in cruelty. When one possesses all five virtues together, each applied appropriately to its function, one can truly be a leader.

— Jia Lin, in commentary on Sun Tzu, Art of War

Machiavelli's The Prince, written in the early-16th century, provided a manual for rulers to acquire royal authority and found lasting regimes.

Prior to the 19th century, the concept of leadership had less relevance than today's society expects: society then expected traditional deference and obedience to lords, kings, master-craftsmen, and slave-masters — regardless of any personal "leadership" traits. The Oxford English Dictionary traces the word "leadership" in English only as far back as 1821, when the term referred to the position or office of a designated leader. The abstract notion of "leadership" as embodying the qualities and behaviors associated with leaders and influencers developed only later during the 19th and 20th centuries – possibly traceable from 1870 onwards. Historically, industrialization, opposition to the ancien regime, and the phasing out of chattel slavery meant that some newly developing organizations (nation-state republics, commercial corporations) evolved a need for a new paradigm with which to characterize elected politicians and job-granting employers – thus the development and theorizing of the idea of "leadership". The functional relationship between leaders and followers may remain, but acceptable (perhaps euphemistic) terminology has changed.

Starting in the 19th century, the elaboration of anarchist thought called the whole concept of leadership into question. One response to this denial of élitism came with Leninism – Lenin (1870–1924) demanded an élite group of disciplined cadres to act as the vanguard of a socialist revolution, which was to bring into existence the dictatorship of the proletariat.

Other historical views of leadership have addressed the seeming contrasts between secular and religious leadership. The doctrines of Caesaro-papism have recurred and had their detractors over several centuries. Christian thinking on leadership has often emphasized stewardship of divinely-provided resources – human and material – and their deployment in accordance with a Divine plan. Compare this with servant leadership.

Major John H. Burns, in his 1934 psychological study specifically of military leadership, emphasises the role and functions of a group of soldiers as a herd closely integrated with its leader.

== Theories ==
Anecdotal and incidental observations aside, the serious discipline of theorising leadership began in the 19th century.

=== Early Western history ===
The search for the characteristics or traits of leaders has continued for centuries. Philosophical writings from Plato's Republic to Plutarch's Lives have explored the question "What qualities distinguish an individual as a leader?" Underlying this search was the early recognition of the importance of leadership and the assumption that leadership is rooted in the characteristics that certain individuals possess. This idea that leadership is based on individual attributes is known as the "trait theory of leadership".

A number of works in the 19th century – when the traditional authority of monarchs, lords, and bishops had begun to wane – explored the trait theory at length: especially the writings of Thomas Carlyle and of Francis Galton. In Heroes and Hero Worship (1841), Carlyle identified the talents, skills, and physical characteristics of men who rose to power. Galton's Hereditary Genius (1869) examined leadership qualities in the families of powerful men. After showing that the numbers of eminent relatives dropped off when his focus moved from first-degree to second-degree relatives, Galton concluded that leadership was inherited.

Cecil Rhodes (1853–1902) believed that public-spirited leadership could be nurtured by identifying young people with "moral force of character and instincts to lead", and educating them in contexts (such as the collegiate environment of the University of Oxford) that further developed such characteristics. International networks of such leaders could help to promote international understanding and help "render war impossible". This vision of leadership underlay the creation of the Rhodes Scholarships, which have helped to shape notions of leadership since their creation in 1903.

=== Rise of alternative theories ===
In the late 1940s and early 1950s, a series of qualitative reviews prompted researchers to take a drastically different view of the driving forces behind leadership. In reviewing the extant literature, Stogdill and Mann found that while some traits were common across a number of studies, the overall evidence suggested that people who are leaders in one situation may not necessarily be leaders in other situations. Subsequently, leadership was no longer characterized as an enduring individual trait – situational approaches (see alternative leadership theories below) posited that individuals can be effective in certain situations, but not others. The focus then shifted away from traits of leaders to an investigation of the effective leader behaviors. This approach dominated much of the leadership theory and research for the next few decades.

=== Reemergence of trait theory ===
New methods and measurements were developed after these influential reviews that would ultimately reestablish trait theory as a viable approach to the study of leadership. For example, improvements in researchers' use of the round-robin research design methodology allowed researchers to see that individuals can and do emerge as leaders across a variety of situations and tasks. Additionally, during the 1980s statistical advances allowed researchers to conduct meta-analyses, in which they could quantitatively analyze and summarize the findings from a wide array of studies. This advent allowed trait theorists to create a comprehensive picture of previous leadership research rather than rely on the qualitative reviews of the past. Equipped with new methods, leadership researchers revealed the following:

- Individuals can and do emerge as leaders across a variety of situations and tasks.
- Significant relationships exist between leadership emergence and such individual traits as:

- Intelligence
- Adjustment
- Extraversion
- Conscientiousness
- Openness to experience
- General self-efficacy

While the trait theory of leadership has certainly regained popularity, its reemergence has not been accompanied by a corresponding increase in sophisticated conceptual frameworks.

Specifically, Stephen Zaccaro noted that trait theories still:

- focus on a small set of individual attributes such as the "Big Five" personality traits, to the neglect of cognitive abilities, motives, values, social skills, expertise, and problem-solving skills
- fail to consider patterns or integrations of multiple attributes
- do not distinguish between the leadership attributes that are generally not malleable over time and those that are shaped by, and bound to, situational influences
- do not consider how stable leader attributes account for the behavioral diversity necessary for effective leadership

=== Attribute pattern approach ===
Considering the criticisms of the trait theory outlined above, several researchers adopted a different perspective of leader individual differences – the leader-attribute-pattern approach. In contrast to the traditional approach, the leader-attribute-pattern approach is based on theorists' arguments that the influence of individual characteristics on outcomes is best understood by considering the person as an integrated totality rather than a summation of individual variables. In other words, the leader-attribute-pattern approach argues that integrated constellations or combinations of individual differences may explain substantial variance in both leader emergence and leader effectiveness beyond that explained by single attributes, or by additive combinations of multiple attributes.

=== Behavioral and style theories ===
In response to the early criticisms of the trait approach, theorists began to research leadership as a set of behaviors by evaluating the behavior of successful leaders, determining a behavior taxonomy, and identifying broad leadership styles. David McClelland, for example, posited that leadership requires a strong personality with a well-developed positive ego. To lead, self-confidence and high self-esteem are useful, perhaps even essential.

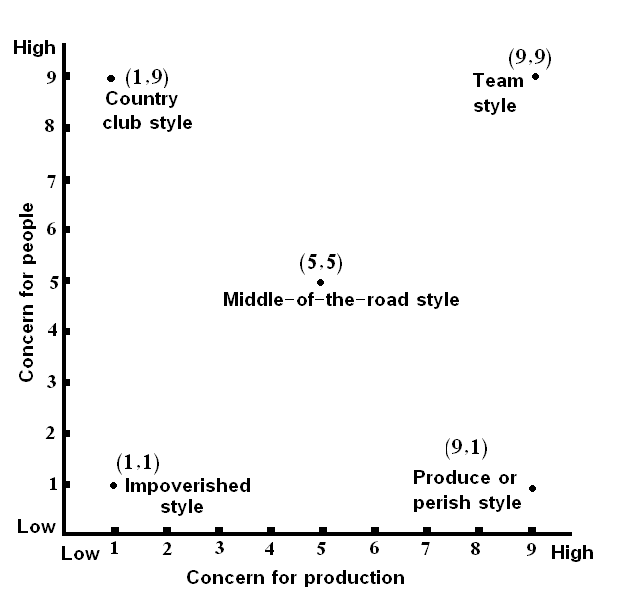
A graphical representation of the managerial grid model

Kurt Lewin, Ronald Lipitt, and Ralph White developed in 1939 the seminal work on the influence of leadership styles and performance. The researchers evaluated the performance of groups of eleven-year-old boys under different types of work climate. In each, the leader exercised his influence regarding the type of group decision making, praise and criticism (feedback), and the management of the group tasks (project management) according to three styles: authoritarian, democratic, and laissez-faire.

In 1945, Ohio State University conducted a study which investigated observable behaviors portrayed by effective leaders. They identified particular behaviors that were reflective of leadership effectiveness. They narrowed their findings to two dimensions. The first dimension, "initiating structure", described how a leader clearly and accurately communicates with the followers, defines goals, and determines how tasks are performed. These are considered "task oriented" behaviors. The second dimension, "consideration", indicates the leader's ability to build an interpersonal relationship with their followers, and to establish a form of mutual trust. These are considered "social oriented" behaviors.

The Michigan State Studies, which were conducted in the 1950s, made further investigations and findings that positively correlated behaviors and leadership effectiveness. Although they had similar findings as the Ohio State studies, they also contributed an additional behavior identified in leaders: participative behavior (also called "servant leadership"), or allowing the followers to participate in group decision making and encouraged subordinate input. This entails avoiding controlling types of leadership and allows more personal interactions between leaders and their subordinates.

The managerial grid model is also based on a behavioral theory. The model was developed by Robert Blake and Jane Mouton in 1964. It suggests five different leadership styles, based on the leaders' concern for people and their concern for goal achievement.

==== Positive reinforcement ====
B. F. Skinner is the father of behavior modification and developed the concept of positive reinforcement. Positive reinforcement occurs when a positive stimulus is presented in response to a behavior, which increases the likelihood of that behavior in the future. The following is an example of how positive reinforcement can be used in a business setting. Assume praise is a positive reinforcer for a particular employee. This employee does not show up to work on time every day. The manager decides to praise the employee for showing up on time every day the employee actually shows up to work on time. As a result, the employee comes to work on time more often because the employee likes to be praised. In this example, praise (the stimulus) is a positive reinforcer for this employee because the employee arrives at work on time (the behavior) more frequently after being praised for showing up to work on time.

Positive reinforcement is a successful technique used by leaders to motivate and attain desired behaviors from subordinates. Organizations such as Frito-Lay, 3M, Goodrich, Michigan Bell, and Emery Air Freight have all used reinforcement to increase productivity. Empirical research covering the last 20 years suggests that applying reinforcement theory leads to a 17 percent increase in performance. Additionally, many reinforcement techniques such as the use of praise are inexpensive, providing higher performance for lower costs.

=== Situational and contingency theories ===
Situational theory is another reaction to the trait theory of leadership. Social scientists argued that history was more than the result of intervention of great men as Carlyle suggested. Herbert Spencer (1884) (and Karl Marx) said that the times produce the person and not the other way around. This theory assumes that different situations call for different characteristics: no single optimal psychographic profile of a leader exists. According to the theory, "what an individual actually does when acting as a leader is in large part dependent upon characteristics of the situation in which he functions."

Some theorists synthesized the trait and situational approaches. Building upon the research of Lewin et al., academics normalized the descriptive models of leadership climates, defining three leadership styles and identifying which situations each style works better in. The authoritarian leadership style, for example, is approved in periods of crisis but fails to win the "hearts and minds" of followers in day-to-day management; the democratic leadership style is more adequate in situations that require consensus building; finally, the laissez-faire leadership style is appreciated for the degree of freedom it provides, but as the leaders do not "take charge", they can be perceived as a failure in protracted or thorny organizational problems. Theorists defined the style of leadership as contingent to the situation; this is sometimes called contingency theory. Three contingency leadership theories are the Fiedler contingency model, the Vroom-Yetton decision model, and the path-goal theory.

The Fiedler contingency model bases the leader's effectiveness on what Fred Fiedler called situational contingency. This results from the interaction of leadership style and situational favorability (later called situational control). The theory defines two types of leader: those who tend to accomplish the task by developing good relationships with the group (relationship-oriented), and those who have as their prime concern carrying out the task itself (task-oriented). According to Fiedler, there is no ideal leader. Both task-oriented and relationship-oriented leaders can be effective if their leadership orientation fits the situation. When there is a good leader-member relation, a highly structured task, and high leader position power, the situation is considered a "favorable situation". Fiedler found that task-oriented leaders are more effective in extremely favorable or unfavorable situations, whereas relationship-oriented leaders perform best in situations with intermediate favorability.

Victor Vroom, in collaboration with Phillip Yetton and later with Arthur Jago, developed a taxonomy for describing leadership situations. They used this in a normative decision model in which leadership styles were connected to situational variables, defining which approach was more suitable to which situation. This approach supported the idea that a manager could rely on different group decision making approaches depending on the attributes of each situation. This model was later referred to as situational contingency theory.

The path-goal theory of leadership was developed by Robert House and was based on the expectancy theory of Victor Vroom. According to House, "leaders, to be effective, engage in behaviors that complement subordinates' environments and abilities in a manner that compensates for deficiencies and is instrumental to subordinate satisfaction and individual and work unit performance". The theory identifies four leader behaviors, achievement-oriented, directive, participative, and supportive, that are contingent to environment factors and follower characteristics. In contrast to the Fiedler contingency model, the path-goal model states that the four leadership behaviors are fluid, and that leaders can adopt any of the four depending on what the situation demands. The path-goal model can be classified both as a contingency theory, as it depends on the circumstances, and as a transactional leadership theory, as the theory emphasizes the reciprocity behavior between the leader and the followers.

=== Functional theory ===
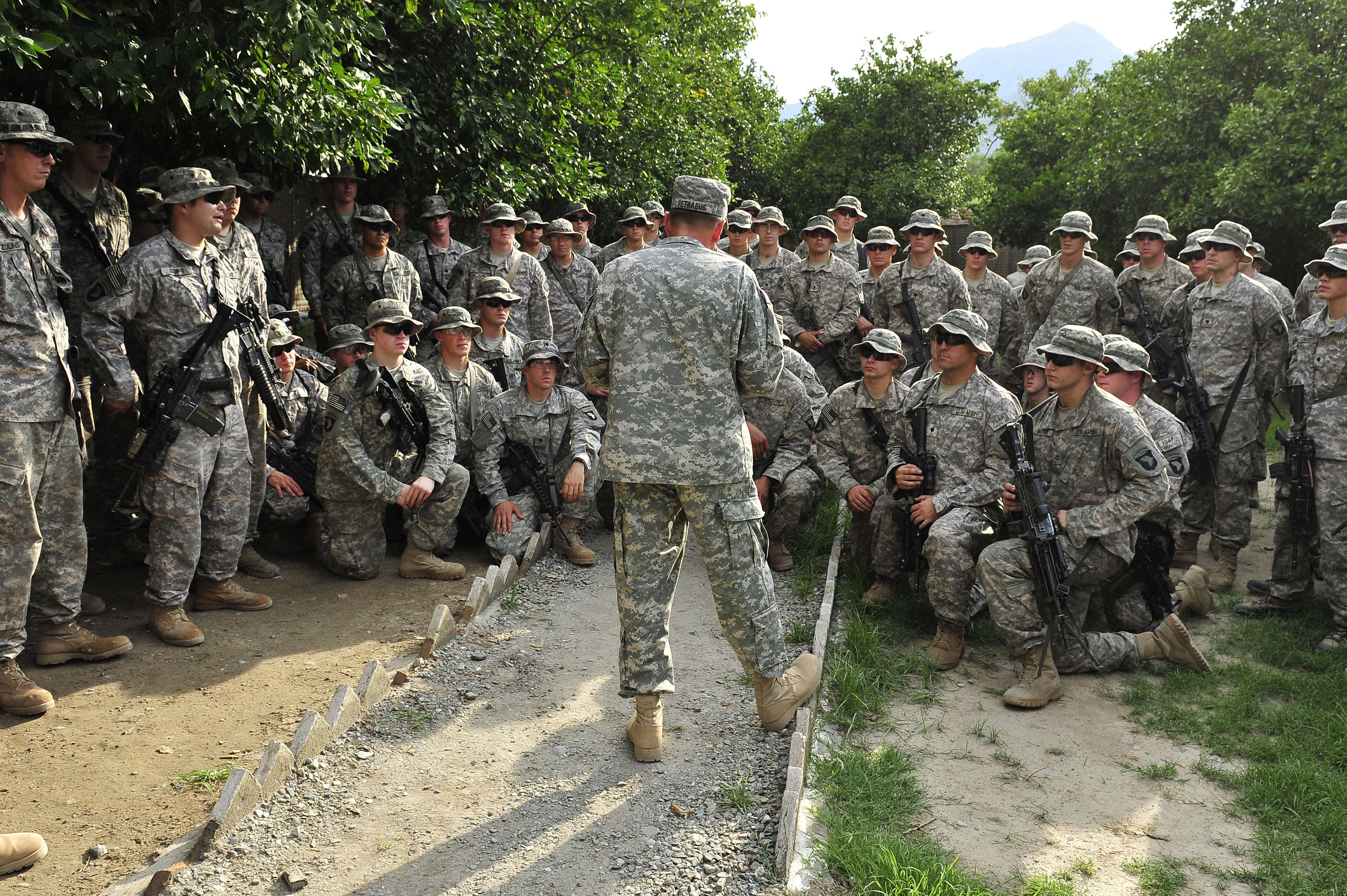
General David Petraeus talks with U.S. soldiers serving in Afghanistan.

Functional leadership theory addresses specific leader behaviors that contribute to organizational or unit effectiveness. This theory argues that the leader's main job is to see that whatever is necessary to group needs is taken care of; thus, a leader can be said to have done their job well when they have contributed to group effectiveness and cohesion. While functional leadership theory has most often been applied to team leadership, it has also been effectively applied to broader organizational leadership as well. In summarizing literature on functional leadership, researchers observed five broad functions a leader performs when promoting organization's effectiveness. These functions include environmental monitoring, organizing subordinate activities, teaching and coaching subordinates, motivating others, and intervening actively in the group's work.

Various leadership behaviors facilitate these functions. In initial work identifying leader behavior, Fleishman observed that subordinates perceived their supervisors' behavior in terms of two broad categories referred to as consideration and initiating structure. Consideration includes behavior involved in fostering effective relationships. Examples of such behavior would include showing concern for a subordinate or acting in a supportive manner towards others. Initiating structure involves the actions of the leader focused specifically on task accomplishment. This could include role clarification, setting performance standards, and holding subordinates accountable to those standards.

=== Transactional and transformational theories ===
Bernard Bass and colleagues developed the idea of two different types of leadership: transactional which involves exchange of labor for rewards, and transformational which is based on concern for employees, intellectual stimulation, and providing a group vision.

The transactional leader is given power to perform certain tasks and reward or punish for the team's performance. It gives the opportunity to the manager to lead the group and the group agrees to follow his lead to accomplish a predetermined goal in exchange for something else. Power is given to the leader to evaluate, correct, and train subordinates when productivity is not up to the desired level, and reward effectiveness when expected outcome is reached.

=== Leader–member exchange theory ===
Leader–member exchange (LMX) theory addresses a specific aspect of the leadership process, which evolved from an earlier theory called the vertical dyad linkage model. Both of these models focus on the interaction between leaders and individual followers. Similar to the transactional approach, this interaction is viewed as a fair exchange whereby the leader provides certain benefits such as task guidance, advice, support, and/or significant rewards and the followers reciprocate by giving the leader respect, cooperation, commitment to the task and good performance. However, LMX recognizes that leaders and individual followers will vary in the type of exchange that develops between them. LMX theorizes that the type of exchanges between the leader and specific followers can lead to the creation of in-groups and out-groups. In-group members are said to have high-quality exchanges with the leader, while out-group members have low-quality exchanges with the leader.

==== In-group members ====
In-group members are perceived by the leader as being more experienced, competent, and willing to assume responsibility than other followers. The leader begins to rely on these individuals to help with especially challenging tasks. If the follower responds well, the leader rewards them with extra coaching, favorable job assignments, and developmental experiences. If the follower shows high commitment and effort followed by additional rewards, both parties develop mutual trust, influence, and support of one another. Research shows the in-group members usually receive higher performance evaluations from the leader, higher satisfaction, and faster promotions than out-group members. In-group members are also likely to build stronger bonds with their leaders by sharing the same social backgrounds and interests.

==== Out-group members ====
Out-group members often receive less time and more distant exchanges than their in-group counterparts. With out-group members, leaders expect no more than adequate job performance, good attendance, reasonable respect, and adherence to the job description in exchange for a fair wage and standard benefits. The leader spends less time with out-group members, they have fewer developmental experiences, and the leader tends to emphasize his/her formal authority to obtain compliance to leader requests. Research shows that out-group members are less satisfied with their job and organization, receive lower performance evaluations from the leader, see their leader as less fair, and are more likely to file grievances or leave the organization.

=== Emotions ===
Leadership can be an emotion-laden process, with emotions entwined with the social influence process. A leader's mood affects his/her group. These effects can be described in three levels:

The mood of individual group members
Members of groups whose leaders are in a positive mood experience more positive mood than do group members with leaders in a negative mood. Leaders transmit their moods to other group members through the mechanism of emotional contagion. Mood contagion may be one of the psychological mechanisms by which charismatic leaders influence followers.
The affective tone of the group
Group affective tone represents the consistent or homogeneous affective reactions within a group. Group affective tone is an aggregate of the moods of the individual members of the group and refers to mood at the group level of analysis. Groups with leaders in a positive mood have a more positive affective tone than do groups with leaders in a negative mood.
Group processes like coordination, effort expenditure, and task strategy
Public expressions of mood impact how group members think and act. When people experience and express mood, they send signals to others. Leaders signal their goals, intentions, and attitudes through their expressions of moods. For example, expressions of positive moods by leaders signal that leaders deem progress toward goals to be good. The group members respond to those signals cognitively and behaviorally in ways that are reflected in the group processes.

In research about client service, it was found that expressions of positive mood by the leader improve the performance of the group, although in other sectors there were other findings.

Beyond the leader's mood, her/his behavior is a source for employee positive and negative emotions at work. The leader's behavior creates situations and events that lead to emotional response, for example by giving feedback, allocating tasks, and distributing resources. Since employee behavior and productivity are affected by their emotional states, it is imperative to consider employee emotional responses to organizational leaders. Emotional intelligence – the ability to understand and manage moods and emotions in the self and others – contributes to effective leadership within organizations.

=== Neo-emergent theory ===
The neo-emergent leadership theory (from the Oxford Strategic Leadership Programme) sees leadership as an impression formed through the communication of information by the leader or by other stakeholders, not through the actions of the leader. In other words, the reproduction of information or stories form the basis of the perception of leadership by the majority. It is well known by historians that the naval hero Lord Nelson often wrote his own versions of battles he was involved in, so that when he arrived home in England, he would receive a true hero's welcome. In modern society, various media outlets, including the press and blogs, present their own interpretations of leaders. These depictions can stem from actual circumstances, but they might also arise from political influences, monetary incentives, or the personal agendas of the author, media, or leader. Consequently, the impression of leaders is often constructed and may not accurately mirror their genuine leadership attributes. This highlights the historical role of concepts like royal lineage, which once stood as a substitute for evaluating or comprehending adept governance abilities.

=== Constructivist analysis ===
Some constructivists question whether leadership exists, or suggest that (for example) leadership "is a myth equivalent to a belief in UFOs".

=== Ontological-phenomenological model ===
Werner Erhard, Michael C. Jensen, Steve Zaffron, and Kari Granger described leadership as "an exercise in language that results in the realization of a future that was not going to happen anyway, which future fulfills (or contributes to fulfilling) the concerns of the relevant parties." In this definition leadership concerns the future and includes the fundamental concerns of the relevant parties. This differs from relating to the relevant parties as "followers" and calling up an image of a single leader with others following. Rather, a future that fulfills the fundamental concerns of the relevant parties indicates the future that was not going to happen is not the "idea of the leader", but rather is what emerges from digging deep to find the underlying concerns of those who are impacted by the leadership.

== Leadership emergence ==
The field of leadership emergence addresses the idea that people born with specific characteristics may become leaders, and that those without these characteristics do not become leaders.

Many personality characteristics are reliably associated with leadership emergence. The list includes, but is not limited to: assertiveness, authenticity, Big-Five personality factors, birth order, character strengths, dominance, emotional intelligence, gender identity, intelligence, narcissism, self-efficacy for leadership, self-monitoring, and social motivation. Other research in relation to how and why leaders emerge examines factors such as narcissistic traits, absentee leaders, or participation. Modern sophisticated research-methods look at personality characteristics in combination to determine patterns of leadership emergence.

Recognized leaders like Mahatma Gandhi, Abraham Lincoln, and Nelson Mandela exhibit traits in common that an average person does not. Research indicates that up to 30% of leader emergence has a genetic basis. No research has found a "leadership gene"; instead potential leaders inherit certain traits that might influence their paths to leadership. Anecdotal and empirical evidence supports a stable relationship between specific traits and leadership behavior. Using a large international sample, researchers found three factors that motivate leaders: affective identity (enjoyment of leading), non-calculative (leading earns reinforcement), and social-normative (sense of obligation). Recent scholarship emphasizes the importance of strong theoretical foundations in leadership studies, advocating for clearer links between formal theory and empirical research to enhance both scientific rigor and practical relevance.

=== Assertiveness ===
The relationship between assertiveness and leadership emergence is curvilinear: leaders who are either low in assertiveness or very high in assertiveness are less likely to be identified as effective leaders.

=== Authenticity ===
Individuals who are more aware of their personality qualities, including their values and beliefs, and who are less biased when processing self-relevant information, are more likely to be accepted as leaders.

=== Big Five personality factors ===
Those who emerge as leaders tend to be more extroverted, conscientious, emotionally stable, and open to experience, although these tendencies are stronger in laboratory studies of leaderless groups. However, introversion–extroversion appears to be the most influential quality in leadership emergence; specifically, leaders tend to be high in extroversion. Introversion–extroversion is also the quality that can be judged most easily among those in the Big Five Traits. Agreeableness, the last factor of the Big Five personality traits, does not seem to play any meaningful role in leadership emergence.

=== Birth order ===
Those born first in their families, and only children, are hypothesized to be more driven to seek leadership and control in social settings. Middle-born children tend to accept follower roles in groups, and later-borns are thought to be rebellious and creative.

=== Character strengths ===
Sampled individuals seeking leadership positions in a military organization had elevated scores on a number of indicators of strength of character, including honesty, hope, bravery, industry, and teamwork.

=== Dominance ===
Individuals with dominant personalities (they describe themselves as high in the desire to control their environment and influence other people, and are likely to express their opinions in a forceful way) are more likely to act as leaders in small-group situations.

=== Emotional intelligence ===
Individuals with high emotional intelligence have increased ability to understand and relate to people. They have skills in communicating and decoding emotions and they deal with others wisely and effectively. Such people communicate their ideas in more robust ways, are better able to read the politics of a situation, are less likely to lose control of their emotions, are less likely to be inappropriately angry or critical, and in consequence are more likely to emerge as leaders.

=== Intelligence ===
Individuals with higher intelligence exhibit superior judgement, higher verbal skills (both written and oral), quicker learning and acquisition of knowledge, and are more likely to emerge as leaders. Correlation between IQ and leadership emergence was found to be between 0.25 and 0.30. However, groups generally prefer leaders that do not exceed in intelligence the prowess of average member by a wide margin, as they fear that high intelligence may be translated to differences in communication, trust, interests, and values.

=== Self-efficacy for leadership ===
An individual's belief in their ability to lead is associated with an increased willingness to accept a leadership role and to find success in its pursuit.

There are no set conditions for this characteristic to become emergent. However, it must be sustained by an individual's belief that they have the ability to learn and improve it with time. Individuals partly evaluate their own capabilities by observing others; working with a superior who is seen as an effective leader may help the individual develop a belief that he or she can perform in a similar manner.

=== Self-monitoring ===
Individuals who closely manage and adjust their behavior based on the social context, often referred to as high self-monitors, have a greater tendency to assume leadership roles within a group. This propensity is attributed to their heightened interest in elevating their status and their readiness to conform their actions to match the requirements of the given situation.

=== Social motivation ===
People who exhibit both a drive for achievement and a desire for social connections tend to participate actively in group-based efforts to solve problems. Additionally, they have a higher likelihood of being chosen as leaders within these groups.

=== Narcissism, hubris and other negative traits ===
Researchers have studied a number of traits regarded negatively in leaders. Individuals who take on leadership roles in turbulent situations, such as groups facing a threat or ones in which status is determined by intense competition among rivals within the group, tend to be narcissistic: arrogant, self-absorbed, hostile, and very self-confident. Tomas Chamorro-Premuzic has examined incompetence in leaders.

=== Absentee leader ===
Existing research has shown that absentee leaders – those who rise into power, but not necessarily because of their skills, and who are marginally engaging with their role – are actually worse than destructive leaders, because it takes longer to pinpoint their mistakes.

=== Willingness to participate ===
A willingness to participate in a group can indicate members' interest as well as their willingness to take responsibility for how the group performs. Those who do not say much during group meetings are less likely to emerge as leaders than those who speak up. There is however some debate over whether the quality of participation in a group matters more than the quantity.

A hypothesis termed the 'babble effect' or the 'babble hypothesis' has been studied as a factor in the emergence of leaders. It posits that leader emergence is highly correlated with the quantity of speaking time – specifically, a person who speaks a lot in a group setting is more likely to become a group leader.

The quantity of participation is more important that the quality of these contributions when it comes to leader emergence. However, some studies indicate that there must be some element of quality combined with quantity to support leader emergence. Thus, while sheer quantity does matter to leadership, when the contributions made are also of high quality then leader emergence is further facilitated.

== Leadership styles ==
A leadership style is a leader's way of providing direction, implementing plans, and motivating people. It is the result of the philosophy, personality, and experience of the leader. Rhetoric specialists have also developed models for understanding leadership.

Different situations call for different leadership styles. In an emergency when there is little time to converge on an agreement and where a designated authority has significantly more experience or expertise than the rest of the team, an autocratic leadership style may be most effective; however, in a highly motivated and aligned team with a homogeneous level of expertise, a more democratic or laissez-faire style may be more effective. The best style is one that most effectively achieves the objectives of the group while balancing the interests of its individual members.

A field in which leadership style has gained attention is that of military science, which expresses a holistic and integrated view of leadership, including how a leader's physical presence determines how others perceive that leader. The factors of physical presence are military bearing, physical fitness, confidence, and resilience. The leader's intellectual capacity helps to conceptualize solutions and acquire knowledge to do the job. A leader's conceptual abilities apply agility, judgment, innovation, interpersonal tact, and domain knowledge. Domain knowledge for leaders encompasses tactical and technical knowledge as well as cultural and geopolitical awareness.

=== Autocratic or authoritarian ===
Under the autocratic leadership style, all decision-making powers are centralized in the leader, as with dictators.

Autocratic leaders do not ask for or entertain any suggestions or initiatives from subordinates. Autocratic management can be successful as it provides strong motivation to the manager. It permits quick decision-making, as only one person decides for the whole group and keeps each decision to themselves until they feel it needs to be shared with the rest of the group.

=== Participative or democratic ===
The democratic leadership style consists of the leader sharing decision-making abilities with group members by promoting the interests of the group members and by practicing social equality. This has also been called shared leadership.

=== Laissez-faire or free-rein leadership ===
In laissez-faire or free-rein leadership, decision-making is passed on to the subordinates. (The phrase laissez-faire is French and literally means "let them do"). Subordinates are given the right and power to make decisions to establish goals and work out the problems or hurdles, and are given a high degree of independence and freedom to formulate their own objectives and ways to achieve them.

=== Task-oriented ===
Task-oriented leadership is a style characterized by a leader's concentration on the necessary tasks to achieve specific production objectives. Leaders following this approach emphasize the creation of systematic solutions for given problems or goals, ensuring strict adherence to deadlines, and achieving targeted outcomes.

Unlike leaders who prioritize accommodating group members, those with a task-oriented approach concentrate on obtaining precise solutions to fulfill production aims. Consequently, they are skilled at ensuring timely goal attainment, although the well-being of their group members might be compromised. These leaders maintain an unwavering focus on both the overall goal and the assigned tasks for each team member.

=== Relationship-oriented ===
Relationship-oriented leadership is a style in which the leader focuses on the relationships amongst the group and is generally more concerned with the overall well-being and satisfaction of group members. Relationship-oriented leaders emphasize communication within the group, show trust and confidence in group members, and show appreciation for work done.

Relationship-oriented leaders are focused on developing the team and the relationships in it. The positives to having this kind of environment are that team members are more motivated and have support. However, the emphasis on relations as opposed to getting a job done might make productivity suffer.

=== Paternalism ===
Paternalism leadership styles often reflect a father-figure mindset. The structure of team is organized hierarchically where the leader is viewed above the followers. The leader also provides both professional and personal direction in the lives of the members. Members' choices are limited due to the rigid direction given by the leader.

The term paternalism is from the Latin pater meaning "father". The leader is most often a male. This leadership style is often found in Russia, Africa, and Pacific Asian Societies.

=== Transactional and Transformational Leadership ===
Transactional leadership refers to an exchange relationship between a leader and followers in which they both strive to meet their own self-interests. The term transactional leadership was introduced by Weber in 1947. There are several forms of transactional leadership, the first being contingent reward, in which the leader outlines what the follower must do to be rewarded for the effort. The second form of transactional leadership is management-by-exception, in which the leader monitors performance of the follower and takes corrective action if standards are not met. Finally transactional leaders may be laissez-faire, avoiding taking any action at all.

Transformational leadership refers to a leader who moves beyond immediate self interests using idealized influence (charisma), inspirational motivation, intellectual stimulation (creativity), or individualized consideration. Idealized influence and inspirational motivation are when a leader is able to envision and communicate a mutually desirable future state. Intellectual stimulation is when a leader helps their followers to become more creative and innovative. Individualized consideration is when a leader pays attention to the developmental needs of their followers, supporting and coaching them. A transformational leader is one who lead others to lead themselves.

== Gender and leadership ==
The leadership dynamic is affected by the leader's gender, gender diversity of groups, and the gendered nature of organizations, national cultures, and other contexts.

Much research has focused on gender of the leader, with an emphasis on women's leadership. Women continue to be underrepresented in leadership positions, experience a gender pay gap, and face discrimination and stereotypes that limit their emergence as leaders. And yet, scholars have often found women to be equal if not more effective as leaders than men. Major topics of interest have included leadership traits, behaviors, styles, emergence, and effectiveness, as well as the situational, cultural, and individual variables that moderate gender difference effects. Scholars are increasingly interested in and beginning to include intersex, nonbinary and transgender leaders, men as gendered leaders, and how intersections between gender and other social identities affect leadership.

Less research has been conducted regarding how the gender diversity of teams and organizations affects the leadership dynamic. Contextual factors greatly influence research results. Studies have found that gender diversity can both help and hinder team performance, or have neutral effects. A leaders' communication of vision can improve the benefits of gender-diverse teams. Joan Acker identified how organizations can embed gender into organizational cultures, practices, structures, interactions, identity, and organizational logic. Acker's work initiated a great deal of theoretical interest, but empirical studies using the gendered organization theory are still emerging.

Globalization and national culture also affect the leadership dynamic. Women have less access to positions of power in some countries. Scholars have discovered some universality in the traits and qualities deemed necessary for leadership across cultures, but greater variance when it comes to leader-follower relationships, perceptions, and stereotypes. Countries differ in the degree to which men differ from women about the stereotypes about men and women leaders, and masculine and feminine leadership. For example, in one study, when asked to envision a leader, German women imagined a male executive, while Australian and Indian women imagined both men and women. The nation in which leadership takes place may also affect men's and women's leadership behaviors, although the effect of nationality has been stronger than the effect of gender in multiple studies. Scholars acknowledge more research is needed on cross-cultural leadership.

== Performance ==
Some researchers argued that the influence of leaders on organizational outcomes is overrated and romanticized as a result of biased attributions about leaders. Despite these assertions, however, it is largely recognized and accepted by practitioners and researchers that leadership is important, and research supports the notion that leaders do contribute to key organizational outcomes. To facilitate successful leadership performance it is important to understand and accurately measure it.

Job performance generally refers to behavior that contributes to organizational success. Campbell identified a number of specific types of performance dimensions; leadership was one of them. There is no consistent, overall definition of leadership performance. Many distinct conceptualizations are often lumped together under the umbrella of leadership performance. "Leadership performance" may refer to the career success of the individual leader, performance of the group or organization, or even leader emergence. Each of these measures can be considered conceptually distinct. While they may be related, they are different outcomes and their inclusion should depend on the applied or research focus.

Another way to conceptualize leader performance is to focus on the outcomes of the leader's followers, group, team, unit, or organization. In evaluating this type of leader performance, two general strategies are typically used. The first relies on subjective perceptions of the leader's performance from subordinates, superiors, or occasionally peers or other parties. The other type of effectiveness measures are more objective indicators of follower or unit performance, such as measures of productivity, goal attainment, sales figures, or unit financial performance.

— B.M. Bass & R.E. Riggio

A toxic leader is someone who has responsibility over a group of people or an organization, and who abuses the leader-follower relationship by leaving the group or organization in a worse-off condition than when they joined it.

=== Measuring leadership ===
Measuring leadership has proven difficult and complex – even impossible. Attempts to assess leadership performance via group performance bring in multifarious different factors. Different perceptions of leadership itself may lead to differing measuring methods. Nevertheless, leadership theoreticians have proven perversely reluctant to abandon the vague subjective qualitative popular concept of "leaders".

== Traits ==
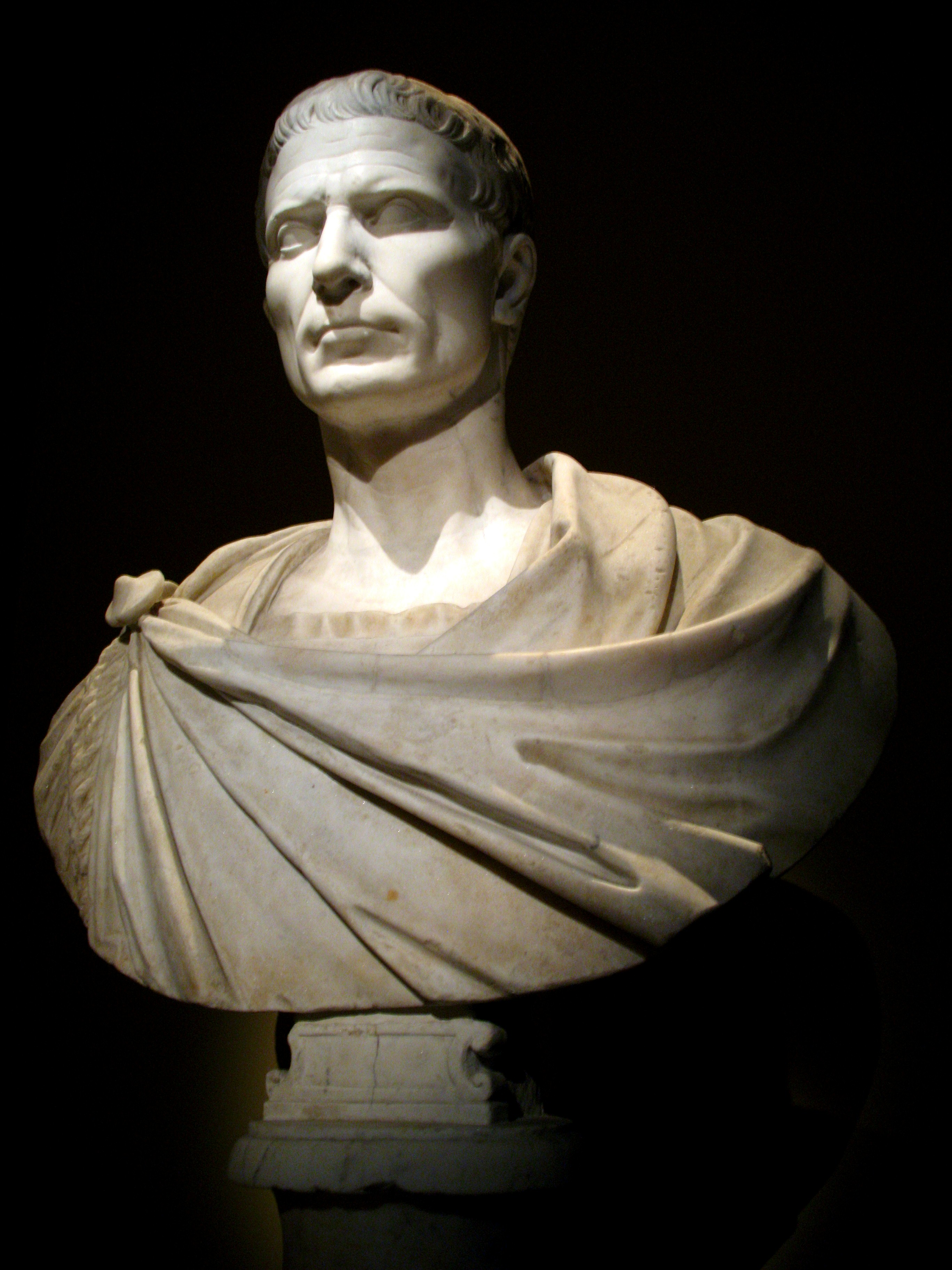
Julius Caesar, one of the world's greatest military leaders

Most theories in the 20th century argued that great leaders were born, not made. Later studies indicated that leadership is more complex and cannot be boiled down to a few key traits of an individual: One such trait or set of traits does not make an extraordinary leader. Scholars have found leadership traits of an individual that do not change from situation to situation – traits such as intelligence, assertiveness, or physical attractiveness. However, each key trait may be applied to situations differently, depending on the circumstances.

Cognitive capacity includes intelligence, analytical and verbal ability, behavioral flexibility, and good judgment. Individuals with these traits can formulate solutions to difficult problems, work well under stress or deadlines, adapt to changing situations, and create well-thought-out plans for the future. Steve Jobs and Abraham Lincoln had the traits of determination and drive as well as possessing cognitive capacity, demonstrated by their ability to adapt to their continuously changing environments.

Sociability describes leaders who are friendly, extroverted, tactful, flexible, and interpersonally competent. Such a trait enables leaders to be accepted by the public, use diplomatic measures to solve issues, and adapt their social persona to the situation at hand. Mother Teresa was an exceptional example who embodied integrity, assertiveness, and social abilities in her diplomatic dealings with the leaders of the world.

== Contexts ==
=== International and global leadership ===
While many scholars conflate the concepts of cross-cultural leadership, international leadership, and global leadership, others have found useful distinctions. The Global Leadership and Organizational Behavior (GLOBE) Project is an example of cross-cultural leadership research, as it aimed to compare leadership ideals in various countries and regions. However, it looked at leaders operating within their own culture, rather than across culture. International leadership addresses the extent to which behavior by a leader from one culture is received in another culture. Global leaders are not only leaders of companies in the global economy, but also embody global competencies such as cognitive complexity, being open to new ideas, and able to deal with uncertainty. Other scholars have identified global leaders as possessing intellectual capital or "global business savvy" as well. Global leaders anticipate and care about the consequences of their actions as related to humanity at large.

=== Organizations ===
An organization that is established as an instrument or as a means for achieving defined objectives has been referred to by sociologists as a formal organization. Its design specifies how goals are subdivided and this is reflected in subdivisions of the organization. Divisions, departments, sections, positions, jobs, and tasks make up this work structure. The formal organization is expected to behave impersonally in regard to relationships with clients or with its members. According to Weber's model, entry and subsequent advancement is by merit or seniority. Employees receive a salary and enjoy a degree of tenure that safeguards them from the arbitrary influence of superiors or of powerful clients. The higher one's position in the hierarchy, the greater one's presumed expertise in adjudicating problems that may arise in the course of the work carried out at lower levels of the organization. This bureaucratic structure forms the basis for the appointment of heads or chiefs of administrative subdivisions in the organization and endows them with the authority attached to their position.

In contrast to the appointed head or chief of an administrative unit, a leader emerges within the context of the informal organization that underlies the formal structure. The informal organization expresses the personal objectives and goals of the individual membership. Their objectives and goals may or may not coincide with those of the formal organization. The informal organization represents an extension of the social structures that generally characterize human life – the spontaneous emergence of groups and organizations as ends in themselves.

In prehistoric times, humanity was preoccupied with personal security, maintenance, protection, and survival. Now humanity spends a major portion of its waking hours working for organizations. The need to identify with a community that provides security, protection, maintenance, and a feeling of belonging has continued unchanged from prehistoric times. This need is met by the informal organization and its emergent, or unofficial, leaders.

Leaders emerge from within the structure of the informal organization. Their personal qualities, the demands of the situation, or a combination of these and other factors attract followers who accept their leadership within one or several overlay structures. Instead of the authority of position held by an appointed head or chief, the emergent leader wields influence or power. Influence is the ability of a person to gain co-operation from others by means of persuasion or control over rewards. Power is a stronger form of influence because it reflects a person's ability to enforce action through the control of a means of punishment.

A leader is a person who influences a group of people towards a specific result. In this scenario, leadership is not dependent on title or formal authority. Ogbonnia defines an effective leader "as an individual with the capacity to consistently succeed in a given condition and be viewed as meeting the expectations of an organization or society". John Hoyle argues that leaders are recognized by their capacity for caring for others, clear communication, and a commitment to persist. French and Raven state that there are Five Bases of Social Power: reward, coercive, legitimate, referent, and expert. Growth of each of these five types of power increases a leader's overall power but attempting to utilize power beyond what they actually have available causes a decrease in their power instead. While a person who is appointed to a managerial position has the right to command and enforce obedience by virtue of the authority of their position, they must possess adequate personal attributes to match this authority because authority is only potentially available to them. In the absence of sufficient personal competence, a manager may be confronted by an emergent leader who can challenge her/his role in the organization and reduce it to that of a figurehead. However, only authority of position has the backing of formal sanctions. It follows that whoever wields personal influence and power can legitimize this only by gaining a formal position in a hierarchy, with commensurate authority. Leadership can be defined as one's ability to get others to willingly follow. Every organization needs leaders at every level.

=== Management ===
The terms "management" and "leadership" have, in the organizational context, been used both as synonyms and with clearly differentiated meanings. However Bennis and Nanus were clear in their distinction in their frequently quoted phrase "Managers are people who do things right and leaders are people who do the right thing".

John Kotter makes a clear distinction between management and leadership. He defines management as the structured, process-driven approach to ensuring an organization consistently delivers quality products and services efficiently, despite the complexity of operations. Whereas leadership is the forward-looking drive to inspire change, seize opportunities, and empower people at all levels through vision and behavior, rather than relying on a few individuals at the top.

Debate is common about whether the use of these terms should be restricted, and reflects an awareness of the distinction made by Burns between "transactional" leadership (characterized by emphasis on procedures, contingent reward, and management by exception) and "transformational" leadership (characterized by charisma, personal relationships, and creativity). The role of leader is one in which one can try to deal with trust issues and issues derived from lacking trust.

=== Group ===
In contrast to individual leadership, some organizations have adopted group leadership. In this so-called shared leadership, more than one person provides direction to the group as a whole. It is furthermore characterized by shared responsibility, cooperation, and mutual influence among team members. Some organizations have taken this approach in hopes of increasing creativity, reducing costs, or downsizing. Others may see the traditional leadership of a boss as costing too much in team performance. In some situations, the team members best able to handle any given phase of the project become the temporary leaders. Additionally, as each team member has the opportunity to experience the elevated level of empowerment, it energizes staff and feeds the cycle of success.

Leaders who demonstrate persistence, tenacity, determination, and synergistic communication skills will bring out the same qualities in their groups. Effective leaders use their own mentalities to energize their team and organizations and lead a team to achieve success.

=== Biology and evolution of leadership ===
Mark van Vugt and Anjana Ahuja in Naturally Selected: The Evolutionary Science of Leadership present cases of leadership in non-human animals, from ants and bees to baboons and chimpanzees. They suggest that leadership has a long evolutionary history and that the same mechanisms underpinning leadership in humans appear in other social species, too. They also suggest that the evolutionary origins of leadership differ from those of dominance. In one study, van Vugt and his team looked at the relation between basal testosterone and leadership versus dominance. They found that testosterone correlates with dominance but not with leadership. This was replicated in a sample of managers in which there was no relation between hierarchical position and testosterone level.

Richard Wrangham and Dale Peterson, in Demonic Males: Apes and the Origins of Human Violence, present evidence that only humans and chimpanzees, among all the animals living on Earth, share a similar tendency for a cluster of behaviors: violence, territoriality, and competition for uniting behind the one chief male of the land. This position is contentious. Many animals apart from apes are territorial, compete, exhibit violence, and have a social structure controlled by a dominant male (lions, wolves, etc.), suggesting Wrangham and Peterson's evidence is not empirical. However, we must examine other species as well, including elephants (which are matriarchal and follow an alpha female), meerkats (which are likewise matriarchal), sheep (which "follow" in some sense castrated bellwethers), and many others.

By comparison, bonobos, the second-closest species-relatives of humans, do not unite behind the chief male of the land. Bonobos show deference to an alpha or top-ranking female that, with the support of her coalition of other females, can prove as strong as the strongest male. Thus, if leadership amounts to getting the greatest number of followers, then among the bonobos, a female almost always exerts the strongest and most effective leadership. (Incidentally, not all scientists agree on the allegedly peaceful nature of the bonobo or with its reputation as a "hippie chimp".)

== Myths ==
Leadership has been described as one of the least understood concepts across all cultures and civilizations. Many researchers have stressed the prevalence of this misunderstanding, stating that several flawed assumptions, or myths, concerning leadership interfere with people's conception of what leadership is about.

=== Leadership is innate ===
According to some, leadership is determined by distinctive dispositional characteristics present at birth (e.g., extraversion, intelligence, or ingenuity). However, evidence shows that leadership also develops through hard work and careful observation. Thus, effective leadership can result from nature (i.e., innate talents) as well as nurture (i.e., acquired skills).

=== Leadership is possessing power over others ===
Although leadership is certainly a form of power, it is not demarcated by power over people. Rather, it is a power with people that exists as a reciprocal relationship between a leader and his/her followers. Despite popular belief, the use of manipulation, coercion, and domination to influence others is not a requirement for leadership. People who seek group consent and strive to act in the best interests of others can also become effective leaders.

=== Leaders are positively influential ===
The validity of the assertion that groups flourish when guided by effective leaders can be illustrated using several examples. For instance, the bystander effect (failure to respond or offer assistance) that tends to develop within groups faced with an emergency is significantly reduced in groups guided by a leader. Moreover, group performance, creativity, and efficiency all tend to climb in businesses with designated managers or CEOs.

The difference leaders make is not always positive in nature. Leaders sometimes focus on fulfilling their own agendas at the expense of others, including their own followers. Leaders who focus on personal gain by employing stringent and manipulative leadership styles often make a difference, but usually do so through negative means.

=== Leaders entirely control group outcomes ===
In Western cultures it is generally assumed that group leaders make all the difference when it comes to group influence and overall goal-attainment. This view relates to reverence for leadership per se or for "heroic charismatic leadership" – a "cult of leadership" in the abstract (as distinct from the cult of a given leader/leadership-group or from some individual-oriented cult of personality). This romanticized view of leadership – the tendency to overestimate the degree of control leaders have over their groups and their groups' outcomes – ignores the existence of many other factors that influence group dynamics. For example, group cohesion, communication patterns, individual personality traits, group context, the nature or orientation of the work, as well as behavioral norms and established standards influence group functionality. For this reason, it is unwarranted to assume that all leaders are in complete control of their groups' achievements.

=== All groups have a designated leader ===
Not all groups need have a designated leader. Groups that are primarily composed of women, are limited in size, are free from stressful decision-making, or only exist for a short period of time (e.g., student work groups; pub quiz/trivia teams) often undergo a diffusion of responsibility, in which leadership tasks and roles are shared amongst members.

=== Group members resist leaders ===
Group members' dependence on group leaders can lead to reduced self-reliance and overall group strength. Most people prefer to be led than to be without a leader. This "need for a leader" becomes especially strong in troubled groups that are experiencing some sort of conflict. Group members tend to be more contented and productive when they have a leader to guide them. Although individuals filling leadership roles can be a direct source of resentment for followers, most people appreciate the contributions that leaders make to their groups and consequently welcome the guidance of a leader.

== Action-oriented environments ==
One approach to team leadership examines action-oriented environments, where effective functional leadership is required to achieve critical or reactive tasks by small teams deployed into the field. Some examples of action-oriented leadership include extinguishing a rural fire, locating a missing person, leading a team on an outdoor expedition, or rescuing a person from a potentially hazardous environment.

Leadership of small groups is often created to respond to a situation or critical incident. In most cases, these teams are tasked to operate in remote and changeable environments with limited support or backup ("action environments"). Leadership of people in these environments requires a different set of skills to that of leaders in front-line management. These leaders must effectively operate remotely and negotiate the needs of the individual, team, and task within a changeable environment.

Other examples include modern technology deployments of small/medium-sized IT teams into client plant sites. Leadership of these teams requires hands-on experience and a lead-by-example attitude to empower team members to make well thought-out and concise decisions independent of executive management and/or home-base decision-makers. Early adoption of Scrum and Kanban branch development methodologies helped to alleviate the dependency that field teams had on trunk-based development. This method of just-in-time action oriented development and deployment allowed remote plant sites to deploy up-to-date software patches frequently and without dependency on core team deployment schedules, satisfying the clients' needs to rapidly patch production environment bugs.

== Critical thought ==
The ideas of Edmund Burke (1729–1797) on representative (as opposed to delegate-based) democracy have echoes in the attitudes of elected representatives who regard themselves – and even portray themselves – as "leaders".

Carlyle's 1840 "Great Man theory", which emphasized the role of leading individuals, met opposition (from Herbert Spencer, Leo Tolstoy, and others) in the 19th and 20th centuries.

Karl Popper noted in 1945 that leaders can mislead and make mistakes – he warns against deferring to "great men".

Noam Chomsky and others have subjected the concept of leadership to critical thinking and assert that people abrogate their responsibility to think and will actions for themselves. While the conventional view of leadership may satisfy people who "want to be told what to do", these critics say that one should question subjection to a will or intellect other than one's own if the leader is not a subject-matter expert.

Concepts such as autogestion, employeeship, and common civic virtue challenge the fundamentally anti-democratic nature of the leadership principle by stressing individual responsibility and/or group authority in the workplace and elsewhere and by focusing on the skills and attitudes that a person needs in general rather than separating out "leadership" as the basis of a special class of individuals.

Various historical calamities (such as World War II) can be attributed to a misplaced reliance on the principle of leadership (German: Führerprinzip) as exhibited in dictatorship.

David John Farmer writes critically of the leader principle and of the cult in which elements throughout society – even in democratic countries – pay deference to the idea of leadership.

The idea of leaderism paints leadership and its excesses in a negative light.

== See also ==
- Politics
- Autocracy – Government where an individual holds absolute power
- Supreme Leader (title)
- Chief executive officer
- Management
- Collective intelligence
