= Culinary arts =

Art of the preparation, cooking, and presentation of food

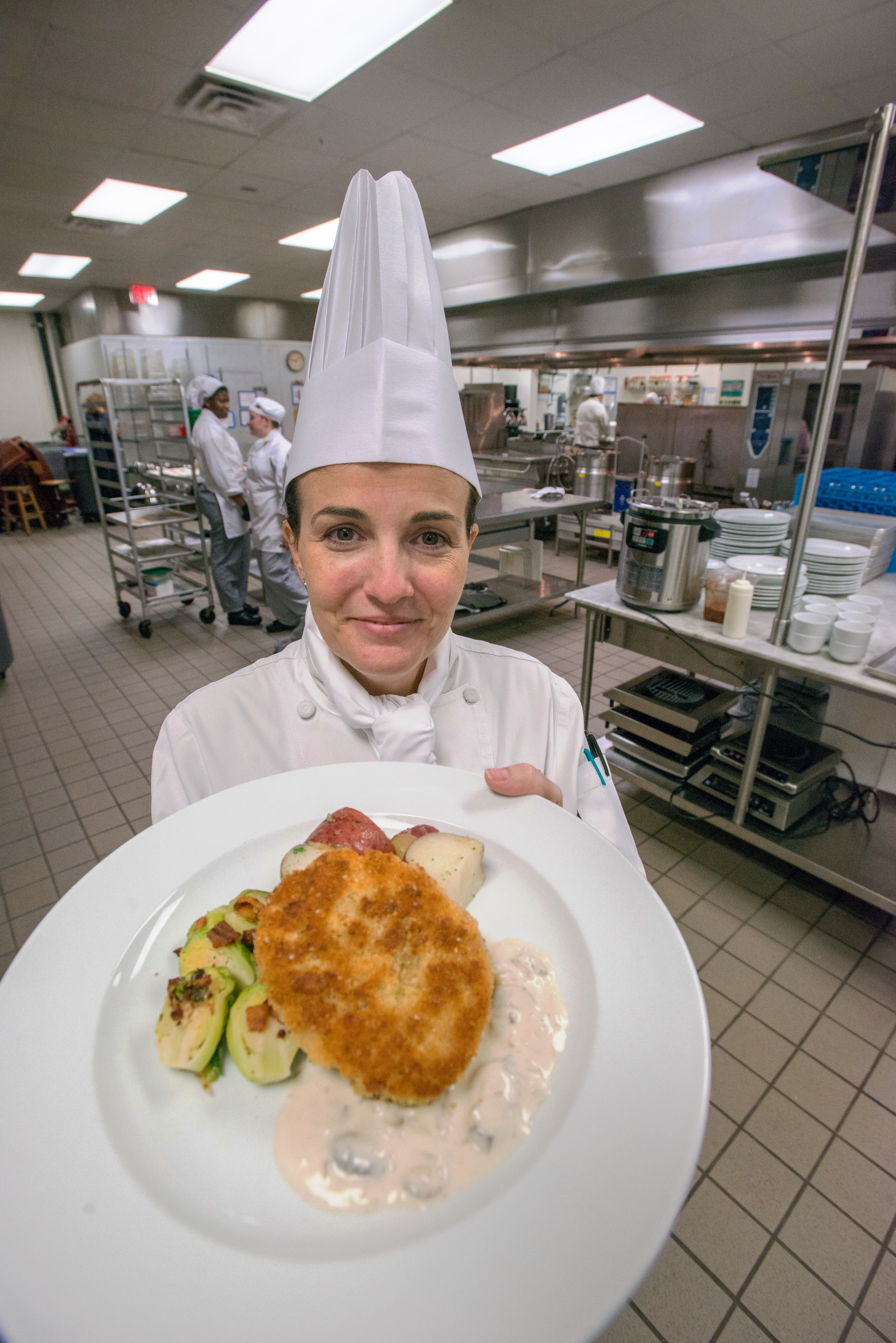
A culinary arts instructor at Gwinnett Technical College in Lawrenceville, Georgia, 2015

Culinary arts are the cuisine arts of the preparation, cooking, and presentation of food, usually in the form of meals. People working in this field – especially in establishments such as restaurants – are commonly called chefs or cooks, although, at its most general, the terms culinary artist and culinarian are also used.

Expert chefs are in charge of making meals that are both aesthetically beautiful and delicious. This often requires understanding of food science, nutrition, and diet. Delicatessens and relatively large institutions like hotels and hospitals rank as their principal workplaces after restaurants.

== History ==
The origins of culinary arts began with primitive humans roughly 2 million years ago. Various theories exist as to how early humans used fire to cook meat. According to anthropologist Richard Wrangham, author of Catching Fire: How Cooking Made Us Human, primitive humans tossed raw pieces of meat into flames to watch them cook. Another theory claims humans discovered roasted meat by chance when they found animals killed in forest fires more appetizing and easier to chew and digest than conventional raw meat.

Culinary techniques improved with the introduction of earthenware and stoneware, the domestication of livestock, and advancements in agriculture. In early civilizations, the primary employers of professional chefs were kings, aristocrats, or priests. The divide between professional chefs cooking for the wealthy and peasants cooking for their families engendered the development of many cuisines.

Much of the study of culinary arts in Europe was organized by Jean Anthelme Brillat-Savarin, famous for saying, "Tell me what you eat, and I will tell you what you are", which has since been mistranslated and simplified into "You are what you eat". Other people helped to parse the different parts of food science and gastronomy. Over time, increasingly deeper and more detailed studies into foods and the culinary arts has led to a greater wealth of knowledge.

In Asia, a similar path led to a separate study of the culinary arts, which later essentially merged with the Western counterpart. In the modern international marketplace, there is no longer a distinct divide between Western and Eastern foods. Culinary arts students today, generally speaking, are introduced to the different cuisines of many different cultures from around the world.

The culinary arts, in the Western world, as a craft and later as a field of study, began to evolve at the end of the Renaissance period. Prior to this, chefs worked in castles, cooking for kings and queens, as well as their families, guests, and other workers of the castle. As Monarchical rule became phased out as a modality, the chefs took their craft to inns and hotels. From here, the craft evolved into a field of study.

Before cooking institutions, professional cooks were mentors for individual students who apprenticed under them. In 1879, the first cooking school was founded in the United States: the Boston Cooking School. This school standardized cooking practices and recipes, and laid the groundwork for the culinary arts schools that would follow.

== Tools and techniques ==
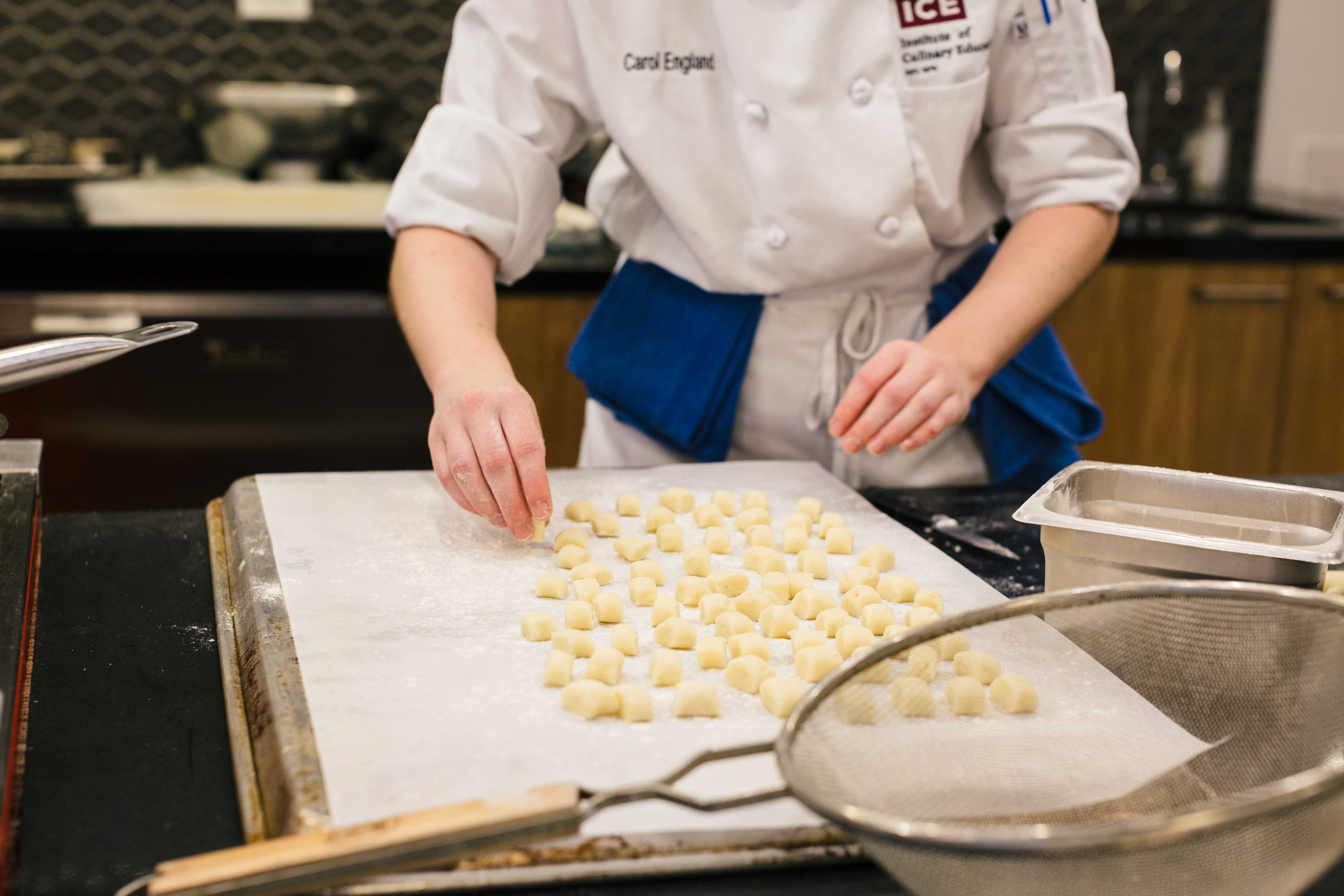
A chef preparing food on a metal baking sheet topped with parchment paper

An integral part of the culinary arts are the tools, known as cooking or kitchen utensils, that are used by both professional chefs and home cooks alike. Professionals in the culinary arts often call these utensils by the French term " Ustensiles De Cuisine " These tools vary in materials and use. Cooking implements are made with anything from wood, glass, and various types of metals, to the newer silicone and plastic that can be seen in many kitchens today.

Within the realm of the culinary arts, there is a wide array of different cooking techniques that originate from various cultures and continue to develop over time as these techniques are shared between cultures and progress with new technology. Different cooking techniques require the use of certain tools, foods and heat sources in order to produce a specific desired result. The professional kitchen may utilize certain techniques that a home cook might not, such as the use of an expensive professional grill.

== Professional study ==
Modern culinary arts students study many different aspects of food. Specific areas of study include butchery, chemistry and thermodynamics, visual presentation, food safety, human nutrition, and physiology, international history, menu planning, the manufacture of food items (such as the milling of wheat into flour or the refining of sugarcane into crystalline sucrose), and many others.

Training in culinary arts is possible in most countries around the world usually at the tertiary level (university) with institutions government-funded, privately funded or commercial. Professional culinary arts programmes are curated educational and skills studies over a 3-year period with select universities and hotel and culinary schools.

== See also ==
- Academy of Nutrition and Dietetics
- Cuisine
- Food pairing
- Food studies
- Gastronomy
- Gourmet Museum and Library
- Hospitality industry

== Bibliography ==
- "Cooking Schools 101". Cooking Schools. N.p., n.d. Web. 17 September 2013
- "History". Of Culinary Archives & Museum. N.p., n.d. Web. 17 September 2013
- "History of Culinary". Culinary Arts information RSS. N.p., nd. web.17 September 2013
- "History of Culinary Arts". Culinary Arts Information RSS. N.p,. web. 17 September 2013
- "The Culinary Timeline". The Culinary Timeline. N.p,.web. 17 September 2013
- Olver, Lynne. "The Food Timeline".
