= Self-domestication =

Scientific hypothesis in ethnobiology

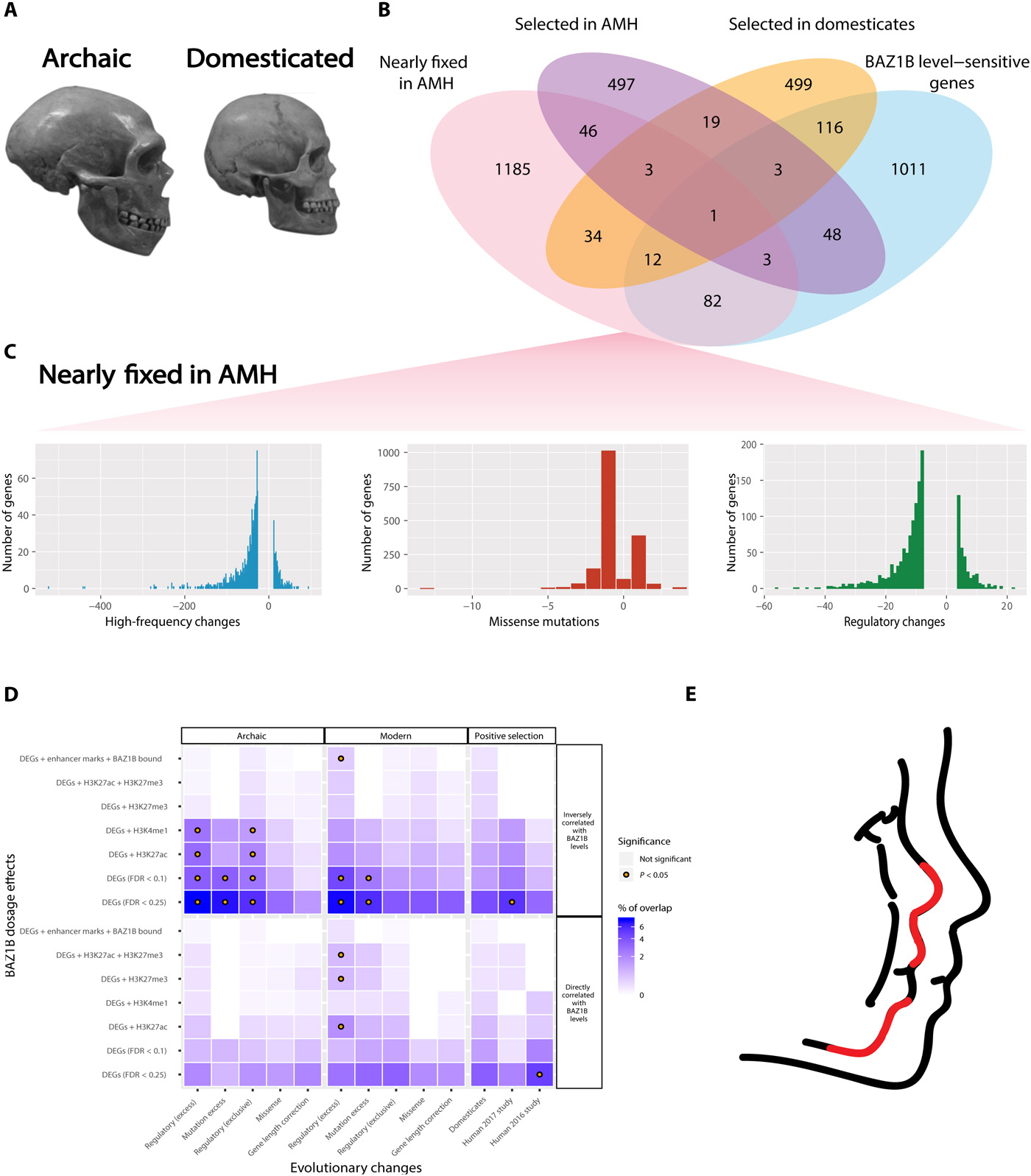
Experiment conducted by the University of Barcelona to demonstrate the hypothesis of self-domestication.

Self-domestication is a scientific hypothesis that posits the occurrence of a process of artificial selection among human beings, akin to that observed in domesticated animals. This process has been executed by human beings themselves. During the process of hominization, a preference for individuals exhibiting collaborative and social behaviors would have emerged, thereby optimizing the benefits for the entire group. This process of artificial selection would have enhanced docility, language, and emotional intelligence. The hypothesis posits that this distinction is the primary factor that distinguishes Homo sapiens from Homo neanderthalensis and Homo erectus.

== Origin and status of the hypothesis ==
In general, domesticated animals possess common characteristics that differentiate them from their non-domesticated counterparts (for example, in the case of Canis familiaris (dogs) compared to their relatives, Canis lupus (wolves), among many other cases): they tend to be more docile and playful, exhibit less aggressive behavior, and show marked neoteny, often resulting in a smaller body, a slightly smaller brain and skull, and shorter teeth and snout.

One of the first to scientifically observe that humans present similar traits was the naturalist, anthropologist, and physician Johann Friedrich Blumenbach around 1800. The author of the thesis De generis humani varietate nativa ('On the natural variations in the human lineage') consequently proposed the hypothesis that humans could have been domesticated.

A few years later, Charles Darwin addressed the topic using the theory of evolution, which already considered the process of artificial selection in animals. Unable to explain the concept of human domestication from an exclusively scientific perspective (the question of who domesticated humans could only be answered in religious or theistic terms), he eventually dismissed the hypothesis.

However, the studies of Dimitri Beliayev in the 20th century were important for the proposal: research on the silver fox demonstrated that in the process of animal domestication, simultaneous changes occurred in behavior (lower levels of adrenaline were observed) and in coat color (alterations in pigmentation): adrenaline could share a biochemical pathway with melanin, a pathway that would be altered during the process of artificial selection.

In 2014, scientists Adam Wilkins (from Humboldt University, Berlin), Richard Wrangham (from Harvard University, Massachusetts), and Tecumseh Fitch (from the University of Vienna) proposed that the common origin of these changes lay in neural crest cells, exclusive stem cells of vertebrates that migrate to different parts of the body during the embryonic phase, giving rise to the adrenal glands (responsible for managing the fear and stress response through adrenaline production), melanocytes (responsible for producing skin or coat melanin), and jaws simultaneously. The deficit of these cells would explain the common characteristics of all domesticated animals: tameness, cranial and mandibular reduction, and alterations in pigmentation.

Of the three members of the research team, it was primatologist Richard Wrangham who translated these results to humans, asserting that humans have "domesticated" themselves through a process of self-selection (a proposal he would elaborate in "The Goodness Paradox: The Strange Relationship Between Virtue and Violence in Human Evolution").

In July 2019, a team from the Institute of Marine Sciences of Barcelona described, through the methylation of certain genes in DNA, the epigenetic and genetic changes through which neural crest cells were reduced. Subsequently, another research team from the University of Barcelona discovered that the BAZ1B gene controls the behavior of neural crest cells. Comparable with the Neanderthal genome, BAZ1B is also related to genes that have many mutations not present in the homologous genes of our past hominini. Cedric Boeckx, one of the researchers in this study, states:

"We believe this means that the genetic network of BAZ1B is an important reason why our face is different compared to other already extinct ancestors, like the Neanderthals [...]. In broad terms, it gives us, for the first time, experimental validation of the autodomestication hypothesis based on the neural crest."

== Hominids ==
Clark and Henneberg argue that during the earliest stages of human evolution a more paedomorphic skull arose through self-domestication. This assertion is based upon a comparison of the skull of Ardipithecus and chimpanzees of various ages. It was found that Ardipithecus clustered with the infant and juvenile species. The consequent lack of a pubertal growth spurt in males of the species and the consequent growth of aggressive canine armoury was taken as evidence that Ardipithecus evolved its paedomorphic skull through self domestication. As the authors state, comparing the species with bonobos:

"Of course A. ramidus differs significantly from bonobos, bonobos having retained a functional canine honing complex. However, the fact that A. ramidus shares with bonobos reduced sexual dimorphism, and a more paedomorphic form relative to chimpanzees, suggests that the developmental and social adaptations evident in bonobos may be of assistance in future reconstructions of early hominin social and sexual psychology. In fact the trend towards increased maternal care, female mate selection and self-domestication may have been stronger and more refined in A. ramidus than what we see in bonobos."

Further research has confirmed that Ardipithecus possessed paedomorphic cranial base angulation, position of the foramen magnum as well as vocal tract dimensions. This was interpreted as not only evidence of a change in social behavior but also a potentially early emergence of hominid vocal capability. If this thesis is correct then not only human social behavior but also language ability originally evolved through paedomorphic skull morphogenesis via the process of self-domestication.

The most comprehensive case for human self-domestication has been proposed for the changes that account for the much later transition from robust humans such as Neanderthals or Denisovans to anatomically modern humans. Occurring between 40,000 and 25,000 years ago, this rapid neotenization has been explained as the result of cultural selection of mating partners on the basis of variables lacking evolutionary benefits, such as perceived attractiveness, facial symmetry, youth, specific body ratios, skin tone or hair, none of which play any role in any other animal species. This unintentional auto-domestication, coinciding with the introduction of imagery of female sexuality, occurred simultaneously in four continents then occupied by hominins. It led to rapid changes typical for domestication, such as in cranial morphology, skeletal architecture, reduction in brain volume, to playful and exploratory behavior, and the establishment of thousands of deleterious conditions, syndromes, disorders and illnesses presumed absent in robust humans.

Of course, these specific views are very clearly based on multi-regionalist perspectives of human evolution which claim modern human populations evolved from relevant archaics present in each world region, as demonstrated in robust skeletal fossils. Such views are largely disproven by genetic evidence supporting the Out of Africa hypothesis with minor inter-breeding and genetic introgression. Despite this, however, human self-domestication entirely within Africa, say, during transition from earlier hominins, especially H. heidelbergensis to H. sapiens remains an open possibility. This would mean archaics in each region (e.g., neanderthals, denisovans) were largely replaced by self-domesticated H. sapiens as they spread around the globe. This possibility suggests self-domestication played a role in the success of modern humans, and the extinction of other lineages.

The idea of self-domestication was used by early Social Darwinism which, according to psychiatrist Martin Brüne in an article "On human self-domestication", developed from the idea that humans could "perfect" themselves biologically. The idea of self-domestication is also related to the concept of sociodicy.

== Modern humans ==
=== Physical anatomy ===
Based on the dating of the fossil record, archaeologists have concluded that self-domestication likely occurred during the Pleistocene, over 300,000 years ago. Using the fossil record to compare Homo sapiens to pre-sapiens ancestors, archaeologists observed many of the same telling phenotypic characteristics that emerge as a consequence of self-domestication in animals. These features include diminished sexual dimorphism, smaller tooth size, reduction of the cranium, and smaller body size. H. sapiens fossils also demonstrated the flattening of brow-ridge projection and shortening of faces.

	Reduced aggression	Reduced cranium and skull	White patches	Floppy ears	Flattened facial projection	Small teeth	Juvenility	Curly Tails
Cats	Y	Y	Y	N	Y		N	N
Dogs	Y	Y	Y	Y	Y	Y	Y	Y
Bonobos	Y	Y	Y	N	Y	Y	Y	NA
Marmosets	Y	NA	Y	N	NA	NA	NA	NA
Humans	Y	Y	N	N	Y	Y	Y	NA

=== Reactive aggression ===
Richard Wrangham further built upon this body of research, addressing how bonobos and chimpanzees could elucidate development of aggression in humans. Academics have raised concerns with inconsistencies with the self-domestication hypothesis, pointing out that it isn't logical that humans could potentially be domesticated given the profundity of violent acts for which they are responsible. Reconciling this paradox, Wrangham posited that self-domestication is the outcome of two different kinds of aggression: proactive and reactive aggression.

Proactive aggression, which is commonly observed in chimpanzees, is defined as an attack that was planned, motivated by achieving an end goal. Generally, humans demonstrate lower aggression within groups. Reactive aggression, much more closely associated with anger, is characterized as an immediate response to a threat—the human equivalent being "bar fights". Aligned with the behavior of self-domesticated bonobos, humans do not have a high propensity for reactive aggression. This lends further evidence to supporting the self-domestication hypothesis, of which reduced reactive aggression is a central trait.

=== Population density hypothesis ===
The population density hypothesis attempts to explain the decreased reactive aggression that is observed in modern humans. During periods of high population density, higher tolerance of associates may be favored due to an increased reliance upon social networks for reliable access to otherwise limited, scarce resources like food. H. sapiens began to exhibit this higher degree of social tolerance approximately 300,000 years ago, which—if this hypothesis upholds—would be associated with a higher population size.

=== Language-based conspiracy ===
The language-based conspiracy provides a convincing argument—and is currently the best-supported theory—explaining why reactive aggression was selected against in modern humans, thereby resulting in self-domestication. H. sapiens are theorized to have developed an elegant propensity for language that surpassed its predecessors, including H. neanderthalensis. Enhanced linguistic ability would have allowed for greater suppression and control over a power-hungry member of early hunter-gatherer societies. Those who attempted to achieve dominance over others would be subject to capital punishment, which was facilitated by shared intentionality from others that was easily communicated through language. Language allowed subordinates to collaborate, coordinating plans to dampen the attempt at dominance by the instigator. Over time, this resulted in the selection against reactive aggression.

=== Criticism ===
A criticism of the theory as applied to humans, is that a number of differences between humans and other great apes are not the result of halted brain development preserving juvenile characteristics into adulthood, but instead arise from accelerated and prolonged brain development - which could indicate other processes are needed to explain important evolutionary changes in humans.

Wrangham argues self-domestication in the context of humans is applicable to the more recent evolution of modern humans from archaic humans over the last 2 million years, and hence the differences between humans and other extant ape species do not disprove human self-domestication.

As a result, some scholars view self-domestication as a useful heuristic concept rather than a fully established evolutionary mechanism.

== See also ==
- De novo domestication
- Domestication
- Ethology
- Evolutionary psychology
- Landrace
- Rewilding (anarchism)
- Sociobiology
- Synanthrope
