= Normative model of decision-making =

Victor Vroom, a professor at Yale University and a scholar on leadership and decision-making, developed the normative model of decision-making. Drawing upon literature from the areas of leadership, group decision-making, and procedural fairness, Vroom’s model predicts the effectiveness of decision-making procedures. Specifically, Vroom’s model takes into account the situation and the importance of the decision to determine which of Vroom’s five decision-making methods will be most effective.

== Decision-making processes ==
Vroom identified five types of decision-making processes, each varying on degree of participation by the leader.

1. Decide: The leader makes the decision or solves the problem alone and announces his/her decision to the group. The leader may gather information from members of the group.
2. Consult (Individually): The leader approaches group members individually and presents them with the problem. The leader records the group member’s suggestions and makes a decision, deciding whether or not to use the information provided by group members.
3. Consult (Group): The leader holds a group meeting where he/she presents the problem to the group as a whole. All members are asked to contribute and make suggestions during the meeting. The leader makes his/her decision alone, choosing which information obtained from the group meeting to use or discard.
4. Facilitate: The leader holds a group meeting where he/she presents the problem to the group as a whole. This differs from consulting approach as the leader ensures that his/her opinions are not given any more weight than those of the group. The decision is made by group consensus, and not solely by the leader.
5. Delegate: The leader does not actively participate in the decision-making process. Instead, the leader provides resources (e.g., information about the problem) and encouragement.

== Situational influence of decision-making ==
Vroom identified seven situational factors that leaders should consider when choosing a decision-making process.

1. Decision significance: How will the decision affect the project’s success, or the organization as a whole?
2. Importance of commitment: Is it important that team members are committed to the final decision?
3. Leader’s expertise: How knowledgeable is the leader in regards to the problem(s) at hand?
4. Likelihood of commitment: If the leader makes the decision by himself/herself, how committed would the group members be to the decision?
5. Group support for objectives: To what degree do group members support the leader’s and organization’s objectives?
6. Group expertise: How knowledgeable are the group members in regards to the problem(s) at hand?
7. Team competence: How well can group members work together to solve the problem?

Vroom created a number of matrices which allow leaders to take into consideration these seven situational influences in order to choose the most effective decision-making process.

== Application ==
Vroom’s normative model of decision-making has been used in a wide array of organizational settings to help leaders select the best decision-making style and also to describe the behaviours of leaders and group members. Further, Vroom’s model has been applied to research in the areas of gender and leadership style, and cultural influences and leadership style.
