= Sociodicy =

Study of the moral contradiction of human society

Sociodicy is the explanation and exploration of the fundamental goodness of human society. It seeks to provide an account for humans' general success in living together (and their enacting of good qualities such as love, friendship, cooperation, and teaching) despite their propensity to selfishness, violence, and evil (which are also clearly a part of human nature) and despite the variation and difference seen across human populations.

The complex relationship between good and evil in human nature is a longstanding topic in philosophy and the social sciences. Sociodicy addresses the conceptual and empirical question: "How can the goodness of the social world be explained despite the badness?" In theology, by analogy, this concern is known as theodicy: "How is God justified in the face of the presence of evil in the world?"

One technical illustration of the concept of sociodicy is the fact that, according to some evolutionary theorists, such as Samuel Bowles, tribalism and out-group hatred in humans (which cause so much conflict and suffering) actually emerged in our species as a way to promote the desirable property of cooperation. For instance, mathematical models suggest that conflict between groups for scarce resources was actually required for altruism to emerge in the human evolutionary past. Another technical illustration is provided by the notion of self-domestication, an idea advanced by physical anthropologists such as Brian Hare, Richard Wrangham, and others, who have argued that some primates, such as bonobos and early hominids, "domesticated themselves" and evolved to become more peaceful through the banding together of less aggressive members of the species to kill more aggressive members. In other words, violent and peaceful tendencies may not only co-exist, but may even depend on each other, in what Wrangham has called the "strange relationship between virtue and violence in human evolution." Indeed, the extreme sort of lethal inter-group conflict seen in humans (e.g., warfare) is very uncommon in animals, as are also the extreme versions of many of the good qualities seen in humans (e.g., friendship and widespread cooperation, including with non-kin).

This concept, in the sense of a "vindication of society despite its failures," was first advanced (and supported with empirical data) by sociologist Nicholas Christakis in his 2019 book, Blueprint: The Evolutionary Origins of a Good Society.

Max Weber himself may possibly also have had such a conceptualization. Though Weber wrote explicitly about "theodicy," and though he did not use the term "sociodicy" per se, he may have been thinking along these lines, as cultural anthropologist Arthur Kleinman noted in 1997: “As the underpinning of capitalism and the social order generally, Weber may actually have had in mind sociodicy—the legitimation of society in the face of its failures—as much as the justification of the cultural authority of divinity.”

== Other Uses of the Term ==
The term "sociodicy" has also been used in prior work in sociology, albeit in different ways.

In perhaps the first usage, Daniel Bell used the term (in 1966) to describe the act of explaining the evolution of the meaning of sociological concepts.

Pierre Bourdieu used this term (in 1979) to explain how ideology can work to justify a then-current state of affairs. Bourdieu was building on a conceptualization of his teacher Raymond Aron (who advanced such an argument in a 1970 lecture).

Stanford Lyman used the term (in 1994) in the sense that the field of sociology as a whole is a way to explain society.

Other authors have explored some of these conceptualizations.
