= Stumm (surname) =

Stumm (German for "mute") is a German language surname from a nickname for a mute person. Notable people with the surname include:

- Chasteen C. Stumm (1848–1895), American journalist, minister, and teacher
- Elizabeth Stumm (1857–1910), American teacher and journalist
- Fabian Stumm (1981), German actor
- Jacob Stumm (1853–1921), Australian politician
- Jennifer Stumm, American violist
- Johann Michael Stumm (1683–1747), German goldsmith and organ builder from the Stumm family of organ builders.
- Sophie von Stumm (1983), British German psychologist
- Werner Stumm (1924–1999), Swiss chemist
