= Employeeship =

Employeeship (or Medarbetarskap in Swedish) is an approach of developing a culture of ownership and responsibility in an organisation. The organisational philosophy has been adopted and researched, most notably in the Southern parts of Ireland

Employeeship is a process where traditional thinking in regards to leadership and subordination in hierarchy is abandoned. The traditional model is replaced by a mindset of partnership, a relationship where both managers and employees take ownership over their work situation. The main objective is to achieve a working environment that stimulates involvement among both employees and managers. Managers develop their skills in facilitation, involving, revealing, and learning to make better use of their employees’ knowledge, ideas, and initiative.

One of the insights that organisations embarking on this approach uncover is that the characteristics often expected and valued in leaders are identical to those of co-workers and colleagues. Therefore, an organisation that embarks on developing employeeship engages the whole workforce, not just the management community. Research shows an increase in levels of openness, honesty, taking responsibility, and community trustworthiness.

== The Elements of Employeeship ==
The key to this approach is for teams to be able to have transparent conversations with their "leader" regarding things that are not normally discussed in the work setting, such as the meaning of loyalty, openness, and transparency; the meaning of work and how it fits in with our lives; relationships between us in the team; responsibility, accountability, and taking initiative; and the service we offer others.

Typically the discussions follow pre-designed questions so that deeper exploration can occur.
