= Demonic Males =

1996 book by Richard Wrangham and Dale Peterson

Demonic Males: Apes and the Origins of Human Violence
- Author: Richard Wrangham; Dale Peterson
- Language: English
- Publication date: 1996
- Publication place: United States
- Pages: 350 pp.
- OCLC: 34798075

Demonic Males: Apes and the Origins of Human Violence is a 1996 book by Richard Wrangham and Dale Peterson examining the evolutionary factors leading to human male violence.

== Summary ==
Demonic Males begins by explaining that humans, chimpanzees, gorillas and orangutans are a group of genetically related great apes, that humans are genetically closer to chimps than chimps are to gorillas, and that chimps and bonobos are most closely genetically related. After speculating about what enabled humans' ancestors to leave the rainforest (the use of roots as sources of water and food), Demonic Males next provides a catalog of the types of violence practiced by male chimpanzees (intragroup hierarchical violence, violence against females, and extragroup murdering raids). The high incidence of rape by non-alpha male orangutans and infanticide by male gorillas are also cited as examples of our mutual genetic heritage.

The authors present chimp society as extremely patriarchal, in that no adult male chimpanzee is subordinate to any female of any rank. They present evidence that most dominant human civilizations have always been likewise behaviorally patriarchal, and that male humans share male chimpanzees' innate propensity for dominance, gratuitous violence, war, rape, and murder. They claim that the brain's prefrontal cortex is also a factor, as humans have been shown experimentally to make decisions based both on logic and prefrontal cortex-mediated emotion.

In the chapter “The Peaceful Ape,” the authors contrast chimpanzee social organization with that of the bonobo, explaining how differences in mating systems, female alliances, and resource distribution have led to lower levels of male-male aggression among bonobos. They emphasize that these behavioral differences arise from ecological and evolutionary factors rather than moral or psychological ones. Reasons given for this include a bonobo female social organization that does not tolerate male aggression, the evolutionary forces of the invisibility of bonobo ovulation (in chimps, ovulation has both olfactory and genital swelling manifestations — this diversity in female reproductive cycles then leads to ferocious male competition for mating), and overall social organization, whereby male bonobos do not form alliances as male chimps do, though this has been contested.

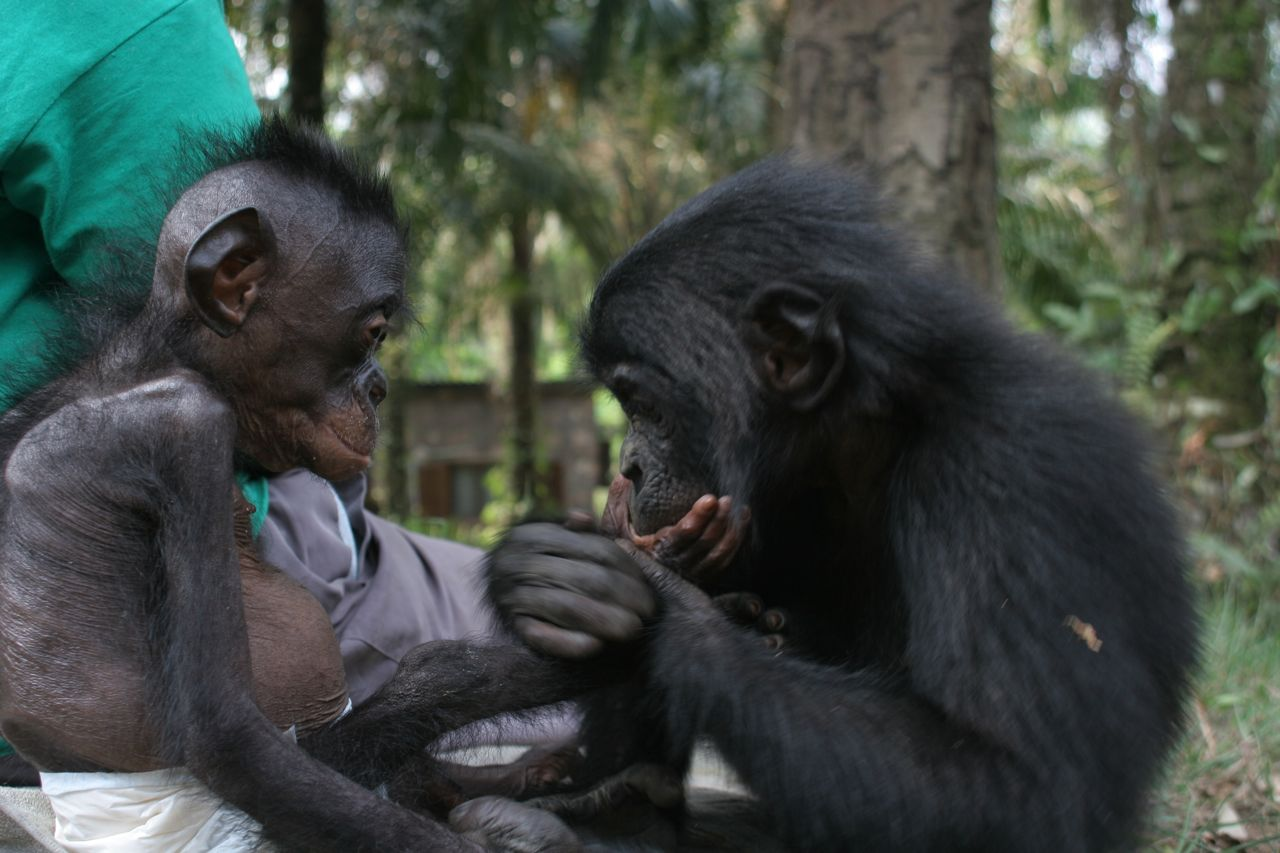
Bonobos strong relationships are seen in this adult caring for the child

Bonobos are dominated by a matriarchal system, and are unique for their female-biased dispersal relationships that encourage resolution and peace-making tactics among the group, and discourage violence and war. Anthropological parallels can be made to human subcultures such as the Hippies, expressed in the motto that Hippies and Bonobos make love, not war.

Drawing on this comparison, Wrangham and Peterson examine the evolutionary origins of male violence, linking it to patterns of competition and alliance observed in chimpanzees. Rather than condemning violence as morally wrong, they describe it as an adaptive strategy that has shaped human social evolution. The authors warn, however, that in the modern world, where weapons and organized conflict magnify the scale of aggression, these ancient impulses pose a profound threat to humanity’s future. They argue that understanding and consciously managing these evolutionary drives is essential for the long-term survival of human societies.

== Reviews ==
The response to the book was wide-ranging, not only in mainstream media but in academia, with reviews in such diverse publications as The New England Journal of Medicine, The Journal of Military History, and Gay & Lesbian Review Worldwide. The book was generally praised as easily readable, highly entertaining (or fascinating), and full of probing anecdotes. The book was cited as important in documenting that lethal violence is overwhelmingly a male trait.

Recommendations for reading were highly polarized, with general interest media promoting the book and specialists in primate studies and anthropology tending to denounce it. The New York Times called it "enjoyable and easy to read" and said it "belongs to the emerging genre of serious scientific books that have something to say about questions of interest to many people, not just to specialists". Reviewers from primatology, biology, and anthropology were much more critical — in some cases, to the point of mockery — with the book described as "titillating and simplistic," unscientific, and filled with "classic tropes of… quackery."

In a political interpretation of Demonic Males, biologist Philip Regal says that the book is partly an attack on the deconstructivist feminist theory that male violence is a purely social construct. Regal also considers the book to be "a broadside against the old utopian dreams of Atlantis, Eden, Elysium, a Golden Age, Romantic paintings, and the late Margaret Mead," which imagined human beings as naturally peaceful.
