= Babble hypothesis =

Theory of leadership

In psycholinguistics and leadership studies, the babble hypothesis (demonstratively labelled the babble effect) is a conjecture that posits a strong correlation between the amount or quantity of speaking time an individual has in group settings and their likelihood of emerging as a leader, as commonly opposed to quality of speech. According to the hypothesis, individuals who contribute more verbal input during group interactions are perceived to have increased speaking time which in turn increases likelihood of them being perceived and recognized as leaders. Those individuals who speak more also receive higher ratings on leader, communication and contribution-related measures.

== Past research ==
Research into the idea that emerging leaders talk a lot has been around for a long time, with Bales making this claim in 1950. One of the earliest studies that directly varied the quality and quantity of verbal interaction was by Regula and Julian (1973). They found that variations in the quantity but not in the quality of task contributions affected whether the power to influence others was attributed to an individual.

There have since been many studies investigating the extent to which speaking time can predict the emergence of leaders in previously leaderless groups. However, many have been either ecologically invalid or used approaches to data collection and analysis techniques that were not comprehensive enough to produce applicable results, namely Riecken (1958), Jaffee and Lucas (1969), and Bavelas, Hastorf, Gross and Kite (1965).

After examining the flaws of previous research, McLaren et al. attempted to address these weaknesses in their own study. In it, diverse groups of participants were observed in challenging strategy games, with measurement of both speaking time and the substance of their utterances. The study confirmed that speaking time had the highest correlation with leadership emergence, surpassing other factors such as intelligence, agreeableness, and game proficiency.

Although the quality of what an individual was saying was not found to have a significant influence, the physical behaviours associated with individuals' speaking time seemed important in their emergence as leaders. This included counts of eye fixation and vocal pitch. Further research shows speaking time and seating position both emerged as significant predictors of more visual attention, which individuals pay more to their perceived leaders. Speaking time was also positively correlated to judges' perceptions of dominance. Dominance is a key quality of leaders, as theories of followership claim people favour dominant leaders in order to enhance their ability to aggress against out-groups.

The study also noted the secondary influence of gender. Gender was found to influence both production and interpretation of speaking time, consistent with the expectation states theory. This theory predicts that in groups that vary in external status markers, such as gender, age and intelligence, the markers become predictors of within-group status through both direct, including voting behaviour, and indirect pathways like speaking time.

== The impact of gender differences ==
The reason for underrepresentation of women in emerging leadership positions can be explained by objective speaking time differences. Equal speaking times are thought to narrow the leadership emergence gender gap. There does not seem to be a correlation with gender differences in leader effectiveness. A follow-up study however found no significant effects for gender when predicting leader emergence or in the amount of time that women and men spoke. This reinforces the idea that speaking time has a larger influence on leadership emergence than the qualities and identity the emerging leader may have.

Changing stereotypes about women and their role in society have allowed women to become more agentic, and this trait has been hypothesised to have a positive relationship with participation. Participation, consistent with the babble hypothesis, increases the likelihood of leader emergence by increasing the prominence a group member has within their group.

Other variables have been found, however, that result in women being less likely to emerge as leaders. Examples of these include the group's cultural background (less egalitarian cultural groups are less likely to have women emerge as leaders) and the amount of time spent interacting with a possible emerging leader (gender differences were found to be attenuated when raters had a larger length of time or multiple occasions to make their judgement on whether someone is an adequate leader). Nevertheless, increased time spent may increase an individual's perceived speaking time and this may be the reason for the leader emergence.

== Criticisms and conclusions ==
Group members seem to regulate the speaking time of other members; suggesting that speaking time may be a result of group processes and perceptions (Bass, 1990). He argued for a dichotomy of quality and quantity of speech.

Furthermore, a 2011 study found that certain personality traits, such as authoritarianism, creativity, extraversion and intelligence, predicted who would emerge as a leader in a previously leaderless group. These, consistently with Bass' theory, will be reflected by the quality of what an emerging leader is saying. Although it may be argued one with more speaking time will have more opportunity to display these personality traits, this research suggests a combination of quality and speaking time will predict leader emergence rather than speaking time alone, challenging the babble hypothesis.

Furthermore, the idea that leadership emergence does not depend on the identity of emerging leaders goes against the social categorisation theory of leadership. Social identity theory states that individuals develop their social identity based on their unique characteristics and their affiliation with a social group, namely their shared experiences with others in the group (Tajfel & Turner (1986)). The social categorisation theory of leadership suggests that people who internalise the identity of the group, and make it part of their social identity, are more likely to emerge as leaders. Leader emergence therefore occurs according to the group prototype, which is the group members' shared representation of their group, including its norms, values, beliefs, and aspirations. This links to both the expectations that members of a group have for their leader and the quality of their leadership, rather than only their speaking time.

Although speaking time may be an accurate predictor of leadership emergence, there are other factors that can impact the extent of the accuracy of predictions based on the babble hypothesis, as many other elements such as gender and expectations can play a role in individuals' perceptions of adequate leaders.

== See also ==
- Agitprop
- Active measures
- Big lie
- Cult of personality
- Firehose of falsehood
- Gish gallop
- Peter principle
