= Group affective tone =

Mood of a group of people

Group affective tone represents the consistent or homogeneous affective reactions within a group.

Group affective tone is an aggregate of the moods of the individual members of the group and refers to mood at the group level of analysis. If the moods of the individual group members are consistent, then group affective tone can be treated as a group property. If, for example, members of a group tend to be excited, energetic and enthusiastic, then the group itself can be described as being excited, energetic and enthusiastic. If the group members tend to be distressed, mistrustful and nervous, then the group can also be described in these terms. Not all groups possess an affective tone; members of some groups do not experience similar moods. Even so, past research indicates that a majority of groups possess an affective tone.

== Dimensions ==
Two dimensions of group affective tone have been identified: positive affective tone and negative affective tone. Research shows that the two dimensions of affect emerge as independent factors and display independent patterns of relationships with other variables.

Group members tend to experience similar moods based on several theoretical mechanisms, including the selection and composition of group members, the socialization of group members, and exposure of group members to the same affective events, such as task demands and outcomes.

Moods tend to be shared among group members through processes such as mood contagion and impression management. Group affective tone is associated with various organizational outcomes such as group prosocial behavior.

== Influence ==
George's (1990) demonstration that characteristic levels of the personality traits of PA and NA, within work groups, are positively associated with their corresponding (positive and negative) affective tones. Group affective tone is influenced by characteristic levels of personality traits within groups. These characteristic levels of personality have been theorized to be brought about by member similarity resulting from attraction-selection-attrition processes described by Schneider (1987). Beyond personality, a number of other factors have been posited to explain why work group members tend to share moods and emotions, for example: (a) common socialization experiences and common social influences; (b) similarity of tasks and high task interdependence; (c) membership stability; (d) mood regulation norms and rules; and (e) emotional contagion.

George believes that a group's affective tone will determine how innovative (and effective) the group will be. An evidence to this belief is that when individuals feel positive they tend to connect and integrate divergent stimulus materials—they are more creative.

George suggests that if all or most individuals in a work group tend to feel positive at work (the group has a "high positive affective tone"), then their cognitive flexibility will be amplified as a result of social influence and other group processes. As a result of these individual and group level processes, the group will develop shared (and flexible) mental models. In effect, groups with a high positive affective tone will be creative.

Analyses suggested that positive group affective tone fully mediated, and negative group affective tone partially mediated, the association between leader mood and group coordination. Successful leaders must efficiently regulate the affective tones of their groups. Leaders who are effective at managing the group's affective tone should have more impact on group processes than will their counterparts.
