= Vroom–Yetton decision model =

Theory in industrial and organizational psychology

The Vroom–Yetton contingency model is a situational leadership theory of industrial and organizational psychology developed by Victor Vroom, in collaboration with Philip Yetton (1973) and later with Arthur Jago (1988). The situational theory argues the best style of leadership is contingent to the situation. This model suggests the selection of a leadership style of groups decision-making.

Leader Styles

The Vroom-Yetton-Jago Normative Decision Model helps to answer above questions. This model identifies five different styles (ranging from autocratic to consultative to group-based decisions) on the situation and level of involvement. They are:

Autocratic Type 1 (AI)
Leader makes own decision using information that is readily available to him or her at the time. This type is completely autocratic.
Autocratic Type 2 (AII)
Leader collects required information from followers, then makes decision alone. Problem or decision may or may not be informed to followers. Here, followers' involvement is just providing information.
Consultative Type 1 (CI)
Leader shares problem to relevant followers individually and seeks their ideas and suggestions and makes decision alone. Here followers do not meet each other and the leader’s decision may or may not reflect his followers' influence. So, here followers' involvement is at the level of providing alternatives individually.
Consultative Type 2 (CII)
Leader shares problem to relevant followers as a group and seeks their ideas and suggestions and makes decision alone. Here followers meet each other, and through discussions they understand other alternatives. But the leader’s decision may or may not reflect the followers' influence. So, here followers involvement is at the level of helping as a group in decision-making.
Group-based Type 2 (GII)
Leader discuss problem and situation with followers as a group and seeks their ideas and suggestions through brainstorming. Leader accepts any decision and does not try to force his or her idea. Decision accepted by the group is the final one.

Vroom and Yetton formulated following seven questions on decision quality, commitment, problem information and decision acceptance, with which leaders can determine level of followers involvement in decision. Answer to the following questions must be either ‘Yes’ or ‘No’ with the current scenario:

1. Is there a quality requirement? Is the nature of the solution critical? Are there technical or rational grounds for selecting among possible solutions?
2. Do I have sufficient information to make a high quality decision?
3. Is the problem structured? Are the alternative courses of action and methods for their evaluation known?
4. Is acceptance of the decision by subordinates critical to its implementation?
5. If I were to make the decision by myself, is it reasonably certain that it would be accepted by my subordinates?
6. Do subordinates share the organizational goals to be obtained in solving this problem?
7. Is conflict among subordinates likely in obtaining the preferred solution?

Based on the answers one can find out the styles from the graph.

== See also ==
- Leadership
