= Stephen Zaccaro =

Stephen J. Zaccaro (born July 3, 1955) is an American professor of psychology from Fairfax, Virginia where he teaches at the George Mason University. He has one book and 100 other works in print, which, according to Google Scholar were cited more than 8934 times bringing the h-index of his to 36.

== Biography ==
In 1987, Zaccaro co-authored a book called Occupational Stress and Organizational Effectiveness and from 1991 to 1992 was a co-author of the Leadership Quarterly issues. In 2001, he was an author of The Nature of Executive Leadership: A Conceptual and Empirical Analysis of Success and a co-author of The Nature of Organizational Leadership: Understanding the Performance Imperatives Confronting Today's Leaders. He also co-authored an issue of Group and Organization Management in 2002, and two years later was a co-author of another book, Leader Development for Transforming Organizations. He obtained his Ph.D. in psychology from the University of Connecticut and currently works as an editor for both the Journal of Business and Psychology and Military Psychology.
