= The Goodness Paradox =

Book on human evolutionary history

- First edition
- Author: Richard Wrangham
- Publisher: Profile Books
- Publication date: 2019

The Goodness Paradox: The Strange Relationship Between Virtue and Violence in Human Evolution is a book by British primatologist Richard Wrangham.

Wrangham argues that humans have domesticated themselves by a process of self-selection similar to the selective breeding of foxes described by Dmitry Belyayev, a theory first proposed by Johann Friedrich Blumenbach in the early 1800s. Charles Darwin disagreed, as have most evolutionary biologists since.

According to paleoanthropologist John D. Hawks, Wrangham follows scholars including Kenneth A. Dodge in dividing human aggression into two types. The first type, "reactive aggression", is when individuals attack in response to provocation. The second type, "proactive aggression", is planned, premeditated, and involves deliberate tactical strikes. To explain his idea, Wrangham invited readers to imagine a commercial airline flight. Other primates crowded into such a space would react by, in Hawks' words, "ripping one another limb from limb". Humans do not because they have a comparatively very low tendency to reactive aggression. Proactive aggression, by contrast, is so highly developed in humans that we must put elaborate security measures in place to prevent others from carrying out plans to bring the plane down.

Wrangham offers a new perspective on a topic that has been investigated notably by Konrad Lorenz and Erich Fromm, whose research is briefly acknowledged.

== See also ==
- The Better Angels of Our Nature
