= Tomas Chamorro-Premuzic =

Argentinian psychologist

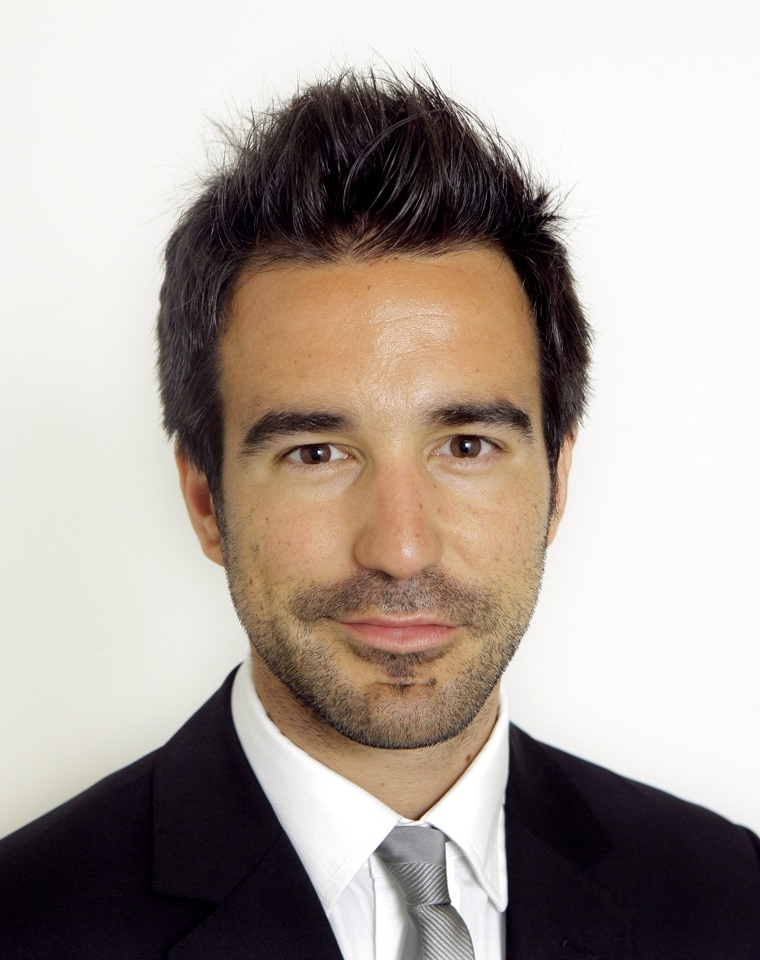
- Born: Argentina
- Occupations: Professor of business psychology at University College London (UCL), chief innovation officer at ManpowerGroup, founder at Deeper Signals
- Known for: Personality profiling and psychometric testing
- Website: www.drtomas.com

Tomas Chamorro-Premuzic (/tʃæˈmɒroʊˈprɛmʊzɪk/) is an organizational psychologist who works mostly in the areas of personality profiling, people analytics, talent identification, the interface between human and artificial intelligence, and leadership development. He is currently a professor of business psychology at University College London (UCL) and an adjunct professor at Columbia University, as well as the chief innovation officer at ManpowerGroup, and was previously the CEO at Hogan Assessment Systems.

== Professional and academic career ==
Chamorro-Premuzic is one of the founders of Meta, a company that creates data-driven tools to help corporations identify employees and leaders with entrepreneurial talent. He also serves as a consultant for both the private and public sectors, with clients that have included JP Morgan, Goldman Sachs, HSBC, Prudential, Unilever, the British Army, the BBC, Twitter, Spotify, and Harvard's Entrepreneurial Finance Lab. He is the director of the MSc in industrial-organizational and business psychology at the University College London (UCL), having previously founded the MSc in occupational psychology at Goldsmiths, University of London. He has also previously taught at the London School of Economics and New York University. He is the author of the column Mr. Personality, which appears regularly on Psychology Today, and contributes regularly to the Guardian, Fast Company, Management Today, Forbes, and Harvard Business Review. In February 2015, Chamorro-Premuzic assumed the role of CEO at Hogan Assessments after spending two years as the company's vice president of research and innovation. The company provides personality assessment services that corporations can utilize for hiring and training purposes. In February 2018, Chamorro-Premuzic assumed the role of Chief Talent Officer at ManpowerGroup. In 2019, Tomas founded Deeper Signals, a personality assessments company that provides modern assessments that companies can utilize for employee feedback and hiring.

== Awards, media appearances and positions ==
Chamorro-Premuzic was awarded with the Early Career Development Award from The International Society for the Study of Individual Differences in 2009. He also received the Daniel E. Berlyne Award for Outstanding Research by a Junior Scholar at the 2010 American Psychological Association Awards. He was selected by Workforce Management as a 2013 Game Changer, an award that recognizes human resources’ innovative rising stars under 40 for their positive impact on the past, present and future of the HR industry. In 2015 he was awarded the Raymond Katzell award for bringing Industrial-Psychology science to the wider public. In 2017 he was elected Fellow to the Society of Industrial and Organizational Psychology (SIOP). He has made multiple media appearances on BBC, CNN, and Sky News, and has appeared on Live from Studio Five and on Big Brother. He serves on the board of directors for The International Society for the Study of Individual Differences (ISSID). He has also served on the editorial board of the APA Division 10 Journal of the Psychology of Aesthetics, Creativity, and the Arts.

== Bibliography ==
Chamorro-Premuzic is the author or co-author of 10 books dealing with psychology and how it relates to individual personality and the workforce. He has also published over 150 scientific articles in peer-reviewed journals.

- Personality And Intellectual Competence, Tomas Chamorro-Premuzic, Adrian Furnham, Routledge, 2005
- Personality and Individual Differences, Tomas Chamorro-Premuzic, Wiley, 2007
- The Psychology of Personnel Selection, Tomas Chamorro-Premuzic, Adrian Furnham, Cambridge University Press, 2010
- The Wiley-Blackwell Handbook of Individual Differences, Tomas Chamorro-Premuzic, Sophie von Stumm, Adrian Furnham, Blackwell Publishing, 2011
- Personality 101, Gorkan Ahmetoglu, Tomas Chamorro-Premuzic, Springer, 2012
- Confidence: Overcoming low Self-esteem, Insecurity, and Self-doubt, Tomas Chamorro-Premuzic, Hudson Street Press, 2013
- The Talent Delusion: Why Data, Not Intuition, Is Key to Unlocking Human Potential, Tomas Chamorro-Premuzic, Little Brown Book, 2017
- Why Do So Many Incompetent Men Become Leaders? (And How to Fix It), Tomas Chamorro-Premuzic, Harvard Business Review Press, 2019
- Don't Be Yourself: Why Authenticity Is Overrated (and What to Do Instead), Tomas Chamorro-Premuzic, Harvard Business Review Press, 2025
