= Victor Vroom =

Canadian psychologist (1932–2023)

- Born: Victor Harold Vroom; August 9, 1932; Montreal, Quebec, Canada
- Died: July 26, 2023 (aged 90)
- Education: McGill University; University of Michigan
- Occupations: Professor, motivation theorist

Victor Harold Vroom (August 9, 1932 – July 26, 2023) was a Canadian psychologist and business school professor at the Yale School of Management.

== Early life ==
Vroom was born in Montreal, Quebec on August 9, 1932. He held a PhD from University of Michigan and an MS and BS from McGill University. Dr. Vroom initially was interested in music as a child, but later found interest in psychology after taking a career interests test in high school that showed he had the best potential of being either a musician or a psychologist. He continued to explore his love for music by playing the alto saxophone and clarinet for his high school band and at local clubs around Montreal. After high school graduation, Vroom initially wanted to become a part of a USA big band, but after being instructed by his father to become a bank teller (for a more stable career) Vroom enrolled in Sir George Williams College (now Concordia University). After his freshman year, he transferred to his alma mater, McGill University, where he earned a special honors bachelor's degree in psychology and a master's in industrial psychology. Before beginning his professional career, he finished his terminal degree (PhD) at the University of Michigan. It was at the University of Michigan that he met his first wife, Ann Workman, with whom he had two sons: Derek and Jeffrey. Later on, he met and is survived by his second wife, Julia Francis, with whom he had their two sons Tristan and Trevor. He died on July 26, 2023, at the age of 90 while living in Guilford, Connecticut.

== Career ==
Victor began his professional career as a director for the Survey Research Center at the University of Michigan, while lecturing. He then took a position at the University of Pennsylvania teaching introductory and foundational courses in psychology, social psychology, and industrial psychology. Later, Vroom began teaching at Carnegie Mellon and began to understand and fit-in more with his strictly business science colleagues. This position eventually propelled him to work for a rebuilding Yale University, where he was appointed chair in only a few weeks, and where he stayed a professor at until his death.

Vroom was also a consultant to a number of corporations such as GE and American Express.

Victor Vroom was appointed Chairman of the Department of Administrative Sciences and associate Director of the Institution for Social and Policy Studies at Yale in 1972.

== Theory of Expectancy ==
His primary research was on the expectancy theory of motivation, which attempts to explain why individuals choose to follow certain courses of action and prefer certain goals or outcomes over others in organizations, particularly in decision-making and leadership. His most well-known books are Work and Motivation, Leadership and Decision Making and The New Leadership. In this theory, he suggested that motivation is largely influenced by the combination of a person's belief that effort leads to performance, which then leads to specific outcomes, and that such outcomes are valued by the individual. Along with the version of Lyman Porter and Edward Lawler, Vroom's formulation is generally considered as representing major contributions to expectancy theory, having stood the test of time and historical scrutiny.

Vroom described the valence of a specific outcome as "a monotonically increasing function of the algebraic sum of the products of the valences of all other outcomes and his conceptions of its instrumentality for the attainment of these other outcomes." The second proposition central to Vroom's theory maintains that "the force on a person to perform an act is monotonically increasing function of the algebraic sum of the products of the valences of all outcomes and the strength of his experiences that the act will be followed by the attainment of these outcomes."

== Publications ==
- 2007. The role of the situation in leadership. American psychologist, 621, 17.
- 2007. On the synergy between research and teaching. Journal of Management Education, 313, 365-375.
- 2005. On the origins of expectancy theory. Great minds in management: The process of theory development, 239-258.
- 2003. Educating managers for decision making and leadership. Management decision, 4110, 968-978.
- 2000. Leadership and the decision-making process. Organizational dynamics, 284, 82-94.
- 1995. Situation effects and levels of analysis in the study of leader participation. The Leadership Quarterly, 62, 169-181.
- 1990. Manage people, not personnel: motivation and performance appraisal. Harvard Business Press.
- 1989. Management and motivation. Penguin.
- 1988. The new leadership: Managing participation in organizations. Prentice-Hall, Inc.
- 1987. A new look at managerial decision making. pp. 365–383. McGraw-Hill/Irwin.
- 1984. Reflections on leadership and decision-making. Journal of General Management, 93, 18-36.
- 1983. Leaders and leadership in academe. The Review of Higher Education, 64, 367-386.
- 1980. An evaluation of two alternatives to the Vroom – Yetton normative model. Academy of Management Journal, 232, 347-355.
- 1978. Predicting leader behavior from a measure of behavioral intent. Academy of Management Journal, 214, 715-721.
- 1977. Hierarchical level and leadership style. Organizational Behavior and Human Performance, 181, 131-145.
- 1976. Can leaders learn to lead?. Organizational Dynamics, 43, 17-28.
- 1974. Perceptions of Leadership Style: Superior and Subordinate Descriptions of Decision-Making Behavior. No. TR-6. YALE UNIV NEW HAVEN CONN SCHOOL OF ORGANIZATION AND MANAGEMENT.
- 1974. Leadership Revisited. No. TR-7. YALE UNIV NEW HAVEN CONN SCHOOL OF ORGANIZATION AND MANAGEMENT.
- 1974. Decision making as a social process: Normative and descriptive models of leader behavior. Decision sciences, 54, 743-769.
- 1974. Decision making and the leadership process. Journal of Contemporary Business, 34, 47-64.
- 1973. Leadership and decision making. Pittsburgh: University of Pittsburgh Press, 1973.
- 1973. The productivity of work groups. Survey Research Center, Institute for Social Research, University of Michigan.
- 1973. Leadership and decision-making. Vol. 110. University of Pittsburgh Pre.
- 1973. A new look at managerial decision making. Organizational dynamics.
- 1972. An overview of work motivation. Reading in industrial and organizational psychology.—NY.
- 1971. The stability of post-decision dissonance: A follow-up study of the job attitudes of business school graduates. Organizational Behavior and Human Performance, 61, 36-49.
- 1971. Relationship between age and risk taking among managers. Journal of applied psychology, 555, 399.
- 1970. The nature of the relationship between motivation and performance. Management and Motivation. Tennessee: Kingsport Press Inc.
- 1969. The handbook of social psychology. The handbook of social psychology, 5.
- 1969. The consequences of social interaction in group problem solving. Organizational Behavior and Human Performance, 41, 77-95.
- 1969. Industrial social psychology. The handbook of social psychology, 5.
- 1968. Toward a stochastic model of managerial careers. Administrative Science Quarterly, 26-46.
- 1967. Methods of organizational research. University of Pittsburgh Press.
- 1966. Organizational design and research: Approaches to organizational design. Vol. 66. University of Pittsburgh Press.
- 1966. Organizational choice: A study of pre-and post decision processes. Organizational behavior and human performance, 12, 212-225.
- 1966. A comparison of static and dynamic correlational methods in the study of organizations. Organizational Behavior and Human Performance, 11, 55-70.
- 1966. Some observations regarding Herzberg’s two-factor theory. In American Psychological Association Convention, New York.
- 1965. Motivation in management. American Foundation for Management Research.
- 1964. Work and Motivation. John Willey & Sons.
- 1964. Employee attitudes. The Frontiers of Management Psychology, New York: Harper & Row. Publishers, 127-43.
- 1964. Some psychological aspects of organizational control. New perspectives in organizational research, 72-86.
- 1964. Division of labor and performance under cooperative and competitive conditions. The Journal of Abnormal and Social Psychology, 683, 313.
- 1962. Ego‐involvement, job satisfaction, and job performance. Personnel psychology, 152, 159-177.
- 1961. Industrial social psychology. Annual review of psychology, 121, 413-446.
- 1960. The effects of attitudes on perception of organizational goals. Human Relations, 133, 229-240.
- 1960. Leader authoritarianism and employee attitudes. Personnel psychology, 132, 125-140.
- 1959. Some personality determinants of the effects of participation. The Journal of Abnormal and Social Psychology, 593, 322.
- 1959. Projection, negation, and the self-concept. Human relations, 124, 335-344.

== Notable Facts ==
Vroom was an avid sailor and captain, having even guided his ship with his family on it during a storm.

Vroom was a part of several semi-professional and professional big bands, one of them he founded in graduate school named "The Intellectuals".

Vroom once had a health scare, being diagnosed as having advanced-staged carcinoma in 1977. It was later discovered that it was actually sarcoidosis, yet he considered it a near-death experience and used it to fuel a lifestyle change.

== Bibliography ==
=== Articles ===
- Vroom, Victor H. (1968). "Towards a Stochastic Model of Managerial Careers". Administrative Science Quarterly. 13 (1): 26–46. doi:10.2307/2391260. JSTOR 2391260.
- Wani, Mohd Ifran (2022). "VROOM'S EXPECTANCY THEORY OF MOTIVATION" – via ResearchGate.

=== Websites ===
- Zeeman, Alexander (2023-04-06). "Victor Vroom biography and books". Toolshero. Retrieved 2023-12-11.
- "Remembering Professor Victor H. Vroom, 1932-2023 | Yale School of Management". som.yale.edu. Retrieved 2023-12-06.

== See also ==
- Normative model of decision-making
- Vroom–Yetton decision model
