= Sophie von Stumm =

Professor of psychology in education

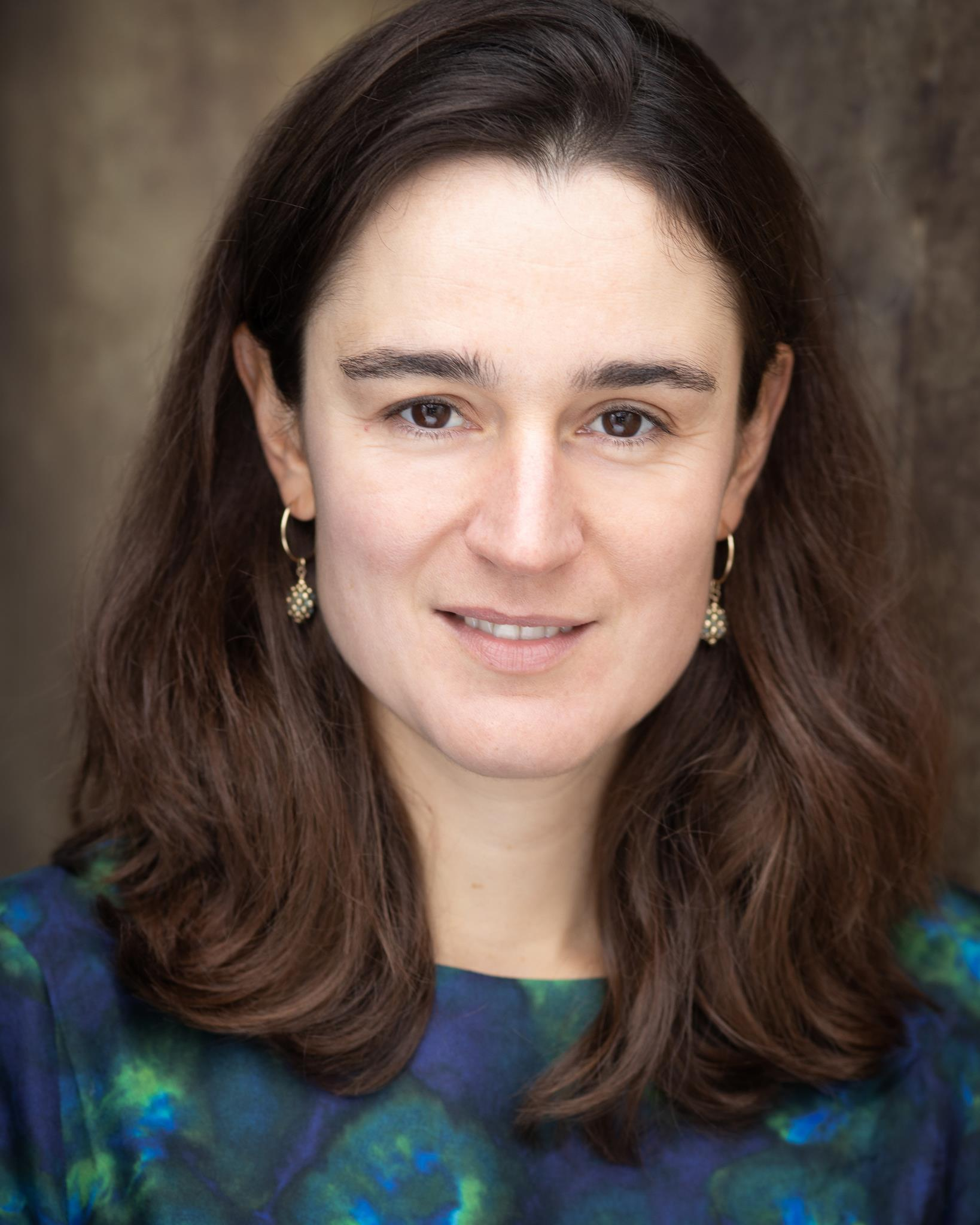
Sophie von Stumm

Sophie von Stumm (born 1983 in Munich) is a professor of psychology in education who studies the causes and consequences of individual differences in psychological and behavioural development across the life course.

== Biography ==
von Stumm attended the Schadow-Gymnasium in Berlin which she graduated from with an Abitur certificate in 2002. After receiving a BSc degree at Royal Holloway University in 2006 and an MSc at the University of Edinburgh in 2007, she completed her PhD in Psychology at Goldsmiths University of London on the topic of intelligence-personality associations in 2010. Afterwards she was awarded an ESRC postdoctoral fellowship that she completed at the Department of Psychology at the University of Edinburgh. She was lecturer and senior lecturer in Psychology at Goldsmiths University of London (2012-2017) and Associate Professor at the London School of Economics (2017-2019). She is currently professor of psychology in education at the University of York.

von Stumm's work has been funded by the British Academy, Wellcome Trust, the Jacobs Foundation, and the John Templeton Foundation. She has developed two research smartphone apps. She won the APS Rising Star Award in 2015 and the ISSID Early Career Award in 2013. She is recipient of a Jacobs Foundation Fellowship 2017-2019.

== Research ==
von Stumm studies the causes and consequences of individual differences in psychological and behavioural development across the life course. She takes an inter-disciplinary approach to observing behaviour and environments, primarily through the application of new assessment technologies that enable collecting big, high-quality data. She focuses her studies in particular on three areas: (1) the effects of early life environments on children’s language development; (2) the role of personality traits like curiosity and imagination for learning; and (3) the relationship between genome-wide polygenic scores and educational attainment.

=== Representative publications ===
- von Stumm, S., Hell, B., & Chamorro-Premuzic, T. (2011). The hungry mind: Intellectual curiosity as third pillar of academic performance. Perspectives on Psychological Science, 6, 574-588.
- Plomin, R., & von Stumm, S. (2018). The new genetics of intelligence. Nature Reviews Genetics, doi:10.1038/nrg.2017.104.
- d'Apice, K., Latham, R., & von Stumm, S. (2019). A naturalistic home observational approach to children's language, cognition, and behaviour. Developmental Psychology, 55(7), 1414-1427.
