= Catching Fire: How Cooking Made Us Human =

2009 book by Richard Wrangham

- September 2009 Profile books edition
- Author: Richard Wrangham
- Language: English
- Genre: Sociocultural evolution Anthropology
- Publisher: Profile Books
- Publication date: September 2009
- Publication place: UK
- Media type: Print (Paperback)
- Pages: 320
- ISBN: 978-1-84668-285-8

Catching Fire: How Cooking Made Us Human, is a 2009 book by British primatologist Richard Wrangham, published by Profile Books in England, and Basic Books in the US. It argues the hypothesis that cooking food was an essential element in the physiological evolution of human beings. It was shortlisted for the 2015 Samuel Johnson Prize.

== History of the idea ==
Eighteenth-century writers noted already that "people cooked their meat, rather than eating it raw like animals". Oliver Goldsmith considered that "of all other animals, we spend the least time in eating; this is one of the great distinctions between us and the brute creation". In 1999, Wrangham published the first version of the hypothesis in Current Anthropology. A short outline of the hypothesis was presented by John Allman (2000) presumably based upon Wrangham (1999).

== Overview ==
Humans (species in the genus Homo) are the only animals that cook their food, and Wrangham argues Homo erectus emerged about two million years ago as a result of this unique trait. Cooking had profound evolutionary effects because it increased food efficiency, which allowed human ancestors to spend less time foraging, chewing, and digesting. H. erectus developed a smaller, more efficient digestive tract, which freed up energy to enable larger brain growth. Wrangham also argues that cooking and control of fire generally affected species development by providing warmth and helping to fend off predators, which helped human ancestors adapt to a ground-based lifestyle. Wrangham points out that humans are highly evolved for eating cooked food and cannot maintain reproductive fitness with raw food.

== Reception ==
=== Positive ===
Book reviewers gave Catching Fire generally positive reviews. The New York Times called it "a rare thing: a slim book—the text itself is a mere 207 pages—that contains serious science, yet is related in direct, no-nonsense prose", and the Daily Telegraph called it "that rare thing, an exhilarating science book".

=== Negative ===
Critics of the cooking hypothesis question whether archaeological evidence supports the view that cooking fires began long enough ago to confirm Wrangham's findings. The traditional explanation is that human ancestors scavenged carcasses for high-quality food that preceded the evolutionary shift to smaller guts and larger brains.

Critics of the hypothesis argue that while a linear increase in brain volume of the genus Homo is seen over time, adding fire control and cooking does not add anything meaningful to the data. Species such as H. ergaster existed with large brain volumes during time periods with little to no evidence of fire for cooking. Little variation exists in the brain sizes of H. erectus dated from periods of weak and strong evidence for cooking. An experiment involving mice fed raw versus cooked meat found that cooking meat did not increase the amount of calories taken up by mice, leading to the study's conclusion that the energetic gain is the same, if not greater, in raw meat diets than cooked meats. Studies such as this and others have led to criticisms of the hypothesis that state that the increases in human brain-size occurred well before the advent of cooking due to a shift away from the consumption of nuts and berries to the consumption of meat. Other anthropologists argue that the evidence suggests that cooking fires began in earnest only 250,000 BP, when ancient hearths, earth ovens, burned animal bones, and flint appear across Europe and the Middle East.

== See also ==
- Control of fire by early humans
- Evolution of the brain
- Dual Inheritance Theory
