= Dale Peterson =

American author (born 1944)

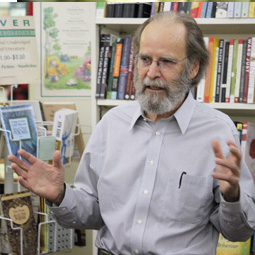
- Born: November 20, 1944 (age 81); Corning, New York
- Occupation: Author
- Writing career
- Genres: Science and natural history
- Notable work: Jane Goodall: The Woman Who Redefined Man
- Website: DalePetersonAuthor.com

Dale Peterson (born November 20, 1944) is an American author who writes about scientific and natural history subjects.

== Early life and education ==
Dale Alfred Peterson was born and raised in Corning, New York, a small town known for glass manufacturing in western New York State. He obtained his BA from the University of Rochester in 1967, then began his graduate studies at Stanford University, first in the writing program under Wallace Stegner, later in the English Department. Stanford awarded him a Ph.D. in English and American Literature in 1977.

== Writing ==
The Vietnam War caused a break in Peterson's graduate studies. As a conscientious objector, Peterson was assigned to alternative service in 1971 at a large U.S. Veterans Administration hospital, working as an attendant on a lock-up ward for severely disturbed or mentally ill patients, many of them diagnosed with schizophrenia. He wrote a novel loosely based on his experiences, which was never published, and began work on a non-fiction treatment of the social and psychological experiences of the mentally ill. That study became an insider's history of mental illness based on autobiographical accounts of madness written during the nearly five and a half centuries between 1436 and 1976: published at last as A Mad People's History of Madness (1982).

After receiving his doctorate, Peterson turned to carpentry, becoming a high-end finish carpenter engaged in remodeling houses in Silicon Valley, incidentally developing some friendships and connections with various people in the computer industry. A young Steve Jobs, for example, gave him one of the early Apple II computers.

Using the Apple II as a word processor, Peterson turned away from carpentry and settled down to writing, first with four books about computers (personal computers, computers in the arts and education, and programming). In partnership with John O'Neill, a London artist who had emigrated to California in order to design artistic games, he also helped create a computer game on the theme of interspecies communication, The Dolphins' Pearl, which was released in 1984.

The Dolphins' Pearl marked a shift in Peterson's interests from intelligent machines and to intelligent animals. Making the decision to write about primates, Peterson began to research the topic at libraries but soon took a more direct approach in a series of arduous trips into tropical forests around the world: starting in the coastal forests of southeastern Brazil, then floating for two thousand miles down the Amazon River from central to the eastern Amazon; exploring critical areas in West, Central, and East Africa; and proceeding from there to Madagascar, southern India, Borneo, Sumatra, and the Mentawai Islands. His proximate goal was to find the twelve most endangered primates (monkeys, apes, and prosimians) in the world. His ultimate goal was to write a book about those animals and their fate. Published in 1989, The Deluge and the Ark: A Journey into Primate Worlds was short-listed for the Sir Peter Kent Conservation Prize in Great Britain.

It also attracted the attention of Dr. Jane Goodall, the pioneering primatologist, who went on to join Peterson in writing a book about the ethical issues of using chimpanzees in captivity and the conservation problems threatening chimpanzees in the wild. Translated into Chinese, German, and Polish, Visions of Caliban: On Chimpanzees and People (1993) was distinguished as a New York Times Notable Book of the Year and a Library Journal Best of the Year.

With Harvard University biological anthropologist Professor Richard Wrangham, Peterson co-authored the classic evolutionary study of human violence Demonic Males: Apes and the Origins of Human Violence (1996), which has been translated into nine foreign languages and honored by The Village Voice as Best of the Year. In 1995 he published a light-hearted book about his travels into obscure parts of Africa looking for chimpanzees (Chimpanzee Travels), and in 1999 he released a second travel book, describing a 20,000-mile road trip taken with his two children in the United States (Storyville USA).

Peterson also turned to biography. Through collecting and editing hundreds of her personal letters, he produced a highly personal, two-volume "epistolary autobiography" of Jane Goodall: Africa in My Blood (2000) and Beyond Innocence (2001). He next wrote Goodall's only full (according to Nature magazine, the "definitive") biography, Jane Goodall: The Woman Who Redefined Man (2006). The New York Times honored it as a Notable Book of the Year, while The Boston Globe called it Best of the Year.

During this general period, moreover, he joined forces with photographer Karl Ammann to tour Central Africa and produce a shocking exposé of the trade in ape meat, Eating Apes (2003), which was pronounced Best of the Year by the Denver Post, Discover, The Economist, and The Globe and Mail. Subsequent African and Asian travels with photographer Ammann resulted in Elephant Reflections (2009) and Giraffe Reflections (2012). Peterson's retrospective narrative of those rough travels in the company of Karl Ammann--Where Have All the Animals Gone? was published late in 2015. Additional recent works include The Moral Lives of Animals (2011) and a play for children entitled Jane of the Apes, which was co-authored with Randel Wright.

For 2013 and 2014, Peterson was named a Fellow at the Radcliffe Institute for Advanced Study at Harvard University. He also, in late 2014, co-organized the Harvard University symposium on Animal Consciousness: Evidence and Implications, a two-day public conversation among prominent American neuroscientists, animal behaviorists, and humanists on issues of animal cognition and consciousness. In 2015, he was a Scholar in Residence at the Erikson Institute for Education and Research, Austen Riggs Center. During this general period (from 2013 forward), Peterson co-edited (with biologist Marc Bekoff) a collection of essays on the influence of Jane Goodall (published in 2015 as The Jane Effect); and completed a nonfiction narrative based on events that happened at Jane Goodall's research station in Gombe Stream National Park, Tanzania, during the late 1960s.

Published by the University of California Press (2018), The Ghosts of Gombe: A True Story of Love and Death in an African Wilderness focuses on the story of a young American volunteer at Gombe who on July 12, 1969, walked out of camp to follow a chimpanzee into the forest. Six days later, her body was found floating in a pool at the base of a high waterfall. In sweeping detail, The Ghosts of Gombe reveals for the first time the full story of day-to-day life at Goodall's wilderness camp—the people and the animals, the stresses and excitements, the social conflicts and cultural alignments, and the astonishing friendships that developed between three of the researchers and three of the chimpanzees—during the months preceding that tragic event. At the same time, it gathers together the story of the young woman's death, examines how it might have happened, and explores some of the painful sequelae that haunted two of the survivors for the rest of their lives.

In 2010, Peterson founded the Henry David Thoreau Prize for Literary Excellence in Nature Writing, an annual literary award designed to honor America's best nature writers. Originally conceived as a program supported and administered by PEN New England, the Thoreau Prize is currently supported and administered by The Thoreau Society, Inc. Since 1984, Peterson has also taught writing part-time in the English Department of Tufts University. He has been an adjunct faculty member of the English Department at Tufts University for more than thirty years and, for the last two, has organized and team-taught an undergraduate course on elephants and elephant conservation through the Tufts University Experimental College.

His latest book, 33 Ways of Looking at an Elephant, is an edited collection of thirty three essential writings about elephants from across history, from Aristotle to the present, with geographical perspectives from Africa and Southeast Asia to Europe and the United States.

== Bibliography ==
=== Non-fiction ===
- Peterson, Dale, ed. (1982). A mad people's history of madness. Pittsburgh, Pa.: University of Pittsburgh Press.
- Big Things From Little Computers (Englewood Cliffs, NJ: Prentice-Hall, 1982).
- Genesis II: Creation and Recreation with Computers (Reston, VA: Reston, 1983).
- Intelligent Schoolhouse: On Computers and Learning (Reston, VA: Reston, 1984). Edited.
- CoCo Logo (New York: John Wiley & Sons, 1985).
- The Dolphins' Pearl (Reston, VA: Admacadium / Reston Computer / Prentice-Hall, 1985). Co-designed with John O'Neill.
- The Deluge and the Ark: A Journey into Primate Worlds (Boston: Houghton Mifflin, 1989).
- Visions of Caliban (Boston: Houghton Mifflin, 1993). Co-authored with Jane Goodall.
- Chimpanzee Travels (Reading, MA: Addison Wesley, 1995).
- Demonic Males: Apes and the Origins of Human Violence (Boston: Houghton Mifflin, 1996). Co-authored with Richard Wrangham. ISBN 978-0-395-87743-2
- Storyville USA (Athens: University of Georgia Press, 1999).
- Africa in My Blood (Boston: Houghton Mifflin, 2000). Edited.
- Beyond Innocence (Boston: Houghton Mifflin, 2001). Edited.
- Eating Apes (Berkeley: University of California Press, 2003).
- Jane Goodall: The Woman Who Redefined Man (Boston: Houghton Mifflin, 2006) ISBN 978-0-395-85405-1.
- Elephant Reflections (Berkeley: University of California Press, 2009).
- The Moral Lives of Animals (New York: Bloomsbury, 2011) ISBN 978-1-59691-424-7.
- Giraffe Reflections (U of California Press) 2013.
- Where Have All The Animals Gone? (Bauhan Publishing) 2015.
- The Jane Effect (Trinity University Press, 2015) 2015. ISBN 1595342532 ISBN 978-1595342539.
- The Ghosts of Gombe: A True Story of Love and Death in an African Wilderness (University of California Press, 2015) 2015. ISBN 0520297717 ISBN 978-0520297715.
- Thirty-Three Ways of Looking at an Elephant Trinity University Press (October 20, 2020) 2020. ISBN 1595348662 ISBN 978-1595348661.

=== Critical studies and reviews of Peterson's work ===
- Condie, Bill (Feb–Mar 2014). "[Untitled review]". Coda. Reviews. Cosmos. 55: 105. Review of Giraffe reflections.
