= Richard Wrangham =

British anthropologist and primatologist

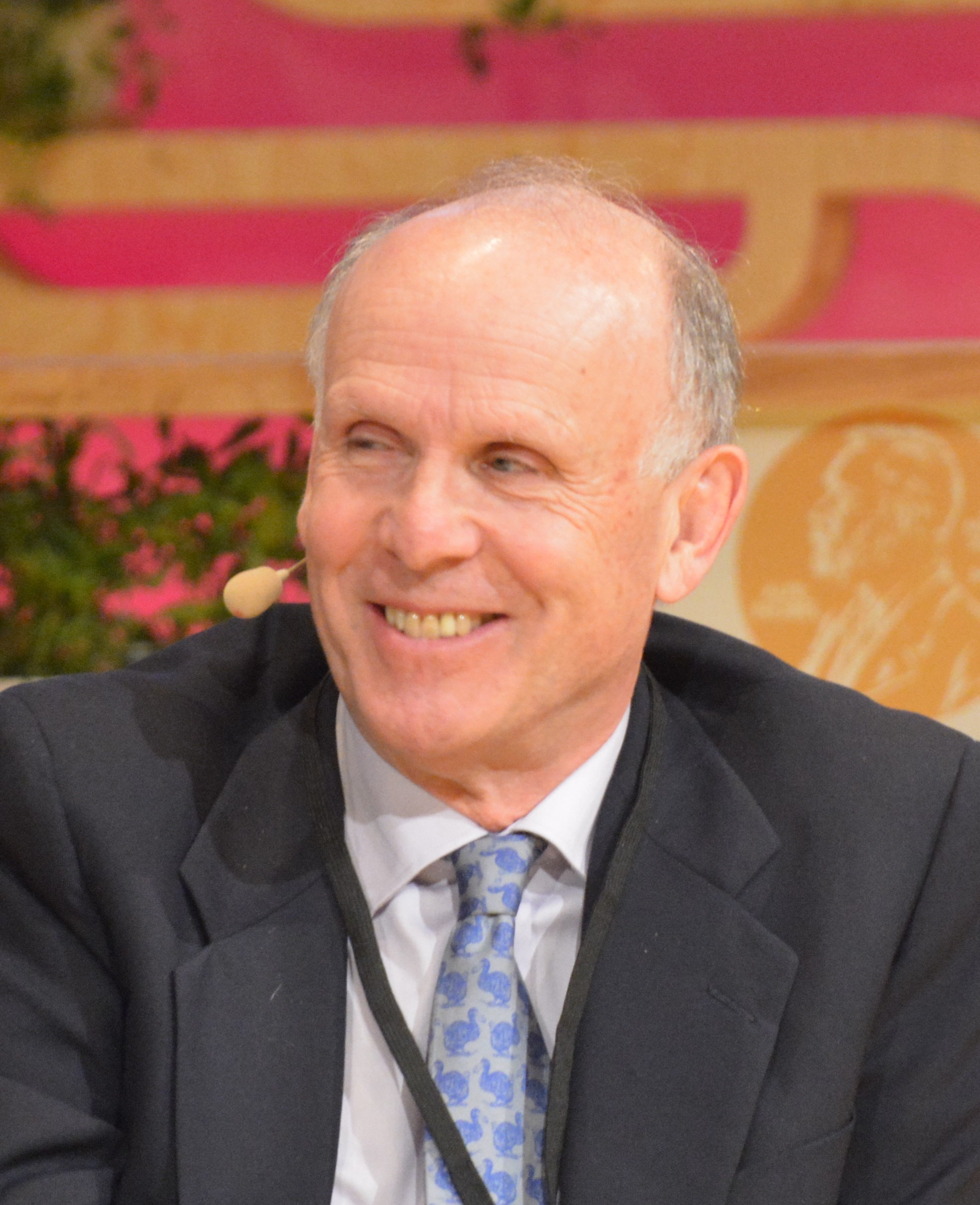
- Wrangham in 2016
- Born: 1948 (age 77–78)
- Employer(s): Harvard University; University of Michigan

Richard Walter Wrangham (born 1948) is an English anthropologist and primatologist; he is Professor of Biological Anthropology at Harvard University. His research and writing have involved ape behavior, human evolution, violence, and cooking.

== Biography ==
Wrangham was born in Leeds, Yorkshire.

Following his years on the faculty of the University of Michigan, he became the Ruth Moore Professor of Biological Anthropology at Harvard University and his research group is now part of the newly established Department of Human Evolutionary Biology. He is a MacArthur fellow.

He is co-director of the Kibale Chimpanzee Project, the long-term study of the Kanyawara chimpanzees in Kibale National Park, Uganda. His research culminates in the study of human evolution in which he draws conclusions based on the behavioural ecology of apes. As a graduate student, Wrangham studied under Robert Hinde and Jane Goodall.

Wrangham is known predominantly for his work in the ecology of primate social systems and the evolutionary history of human aggression. His 1996 book, co-written with journalist Dale Peterson, Demonic Males: Apes and the Origins of Human Violence, was widely reviewed in popular media as well as a diverse array of scholarly publications. His next book, The Goodness Paradox, was published in 2019. He is also known for his research into the role of cooking in human evolution (summarized in his book, Catching Fire: How Cooking Made Us Human) and self-domestication.

Wrangham has been instrumental in identifying behaviors considered "human-specific" in chimpanzees, including culture and with Eloy Rodriguez, chimpanzee self-medication.

Among the recent courses he teaches in the Human Evolutionary Biology (HEB) concentration at Harvard are HEB 1330 Primate Social Behaviour and HEB 1565 Theories of Sexual Coercion (co-taught with Professor Diane Rosenfeld from Harvard Law School). In March 2008, he was appointed House Master of Currier House at Harvard College. He received an honorary degree in Doctor of Science from Oglethorpe University in 2011.

== Research ==
Wrangham began his career as a researcher at Jane Goodall's long-term common chimpanzee field study in Gombe Stream National Park in Tanzania. He befriended fellow primatologist Dian Fossey and assisted her in setting up her nonprofit mountain gorilla conservation organization, the Dian Fossey Gorilla Fund (originally the Digit Fund).

=== Demonic Males: Apes and the Origins of Human Violence (1996) ===
Wrangham's book with journalist Dale Peterson, Demonic Males: Apes and the Origins of Human Violence, argued that aggression, rape, and other violent tendencies are baked into the genes of male primates, a characteristic humans share most notably with chimpanzees. In so doing, the book popularized sociobiological underpinnings of human behavior. As a possible solution to man’s violent tendencies, the authors suggested that humans systematically breed “a kinder, gentler man.” (They noted that this would be unfair to women, however, who prefer "male demonism.")

The response to the book was wide-ranging, not only in mainstream media but in academia, with reviews in such diverse publications as The New England Journal of Medicine, The Journal of Military History, and Gay & Lesbian Review Worldwide. The book was generally praised as easily readable, highly entertaining (or fascinating), and full of probing anecdotes. There was also consensus that the book was important in documenting that lethal violence is overwhelmingly a male trait. Reviewers from primatology, biology, and anthropology were more critical, however — in some cases, to the point of mockery — with the book described as "titillating and simplistic," unscientific, and filled with "classic tropes of… quackery."

=== Catching Fire: How Cooking Made Us Human (2009) ===
In Catching Fire: How Cooking Made Us Human, Wrangham argued that cooking food is obligatory for humans as a result of biological adaptations and that cooking, in particular the consumption of cooked tubers, might explain the increase in hominid brain sizes, smaller teeth and jaws, and decrease in sexual dimorphism that occurred roughly 1.8 million years ago. Some anthropologists disagree with Wrangham's ideas, arguing that no solid evidence supports Wrangham's claims. However, Wrangham and colleagues have demonstrated in the laboratory the effects of cooking on energetic availability: cooking denatures proteins, gelatinizes starches, and helps kill pathogens. The mainstream explanation is that human ancestors, prior to the advent of cooking, turned to eating meats, which then caused the evolutionary shift to smaller guts and larger brains.

== Personal life ==
Wrangham married Elizabeth Ross in 1980 and has three sons. His work of studying violence in chimpanzees caused Wrangham to refrain from eating meat for 40 years.

== Bibliography ==
=== Books ===
- Demonic Males with Peterson, D., Boston, MA: Houghton Mifflin. 1996. ISBN 978-0-395-87743-2.
- Smuts, B.B., Cheney, D.L. Seyfarth, R.M., Wrangham, R.W., & Struhsaker, T.T. (Eds.) (1987). Primate Societies. Chicago: University of Chicago Press. ISBN 0-226-76715-9
- Catching Fire: How Cooking Made Us Human. Basic Books, 2009. ISBN 0-465-01362-7
- The Goodness Paradox: The Strange Relationship Between Virtue and Violence in Human Evolution. Pantheon, 2019. ISBN 978-1-101-87090-7

=== Papers ===
- Wrangham, R (1980). "An ecological model of female-bonded primate groups". Behaviour. 75 (3–4): 262–300. doi:10.1163/156853980x00447.
- Wrangham, R.; Smuts, B. B (1980). "Sex differences in the behavioural ecology of chimpanzees in the Gombe National Park, Tanzania". Journal of Reproduction and Fertility. 28 Suppl: 13–31. PMID 6934308.
- Wrangham, R.; Conklin, N. L.; Chapman, C. A.; Hunt, K. D. (1991). "The significance of fibrous foods for Kibale Forest chimpanzees". Philosophical Transactions of the Royal Society of London. Series B, Biological Sciences. 334 (1270): 171–178. doi:10.1098/rstb.1991.0106. PMID 1685575.
- Wrangham, R (1993). "The evolution of sexuality in chimpanzees and bonobos". Human Nature. 4 (1): 47–79. doi:10.1007/bf02734089. PMID 24214293. S2CID 46157113.
- Wrangham, R (1997). "Subtle, secret female chimpanzees". Science. 277 (5327): 774–775. doi:10.1126/science.277.5327.774. PMID 9273699. S2CID 26175542.
- Wrangham, R (1999). "Is military incompetence adaptive?". Evolution and Human Behavior. 20 (1): 3–17. doi:10.1016/s1090-5138(98)00040-3.
- Wrangham, R.; Jones, J. H.; Laden, G.; Pilbeam, D.; Conklin-Brittain, N. L. (1999). "The raw and the stolen: Cooking and the ecology of human origins". Current Anthropology. 40 (5): 567–594. doi:10.1086/300083. PMID 10539941. S2CID 82271116.
- Eds. Muller, M. & Wrangham, R. (2009). 'Sexual Coercion in Primates and Humans'. Harvard University Press, Cambridge, MA.
