= Confidence =

Feeling of trust in someone or something

Confidence is the feeling of belief or trust that a person or thing is reliable. Self-confidence is trust in oneself. Self-confidence involves a positive belief that one can generally accomplish what one wishes to do in the future. Self-confidence is not the same as self-esteem, which is an evaluation of one's worth. Self-confidence is related to self-efficacy—belief in one's ability to accomplish a specific task or goal. Confidence can be a self-fulfilling prophecy, as those without it may fail because they lack it, and those with it may succeed because they have it rather than because of an innate ability or skill.

== History ==
Ideas about the causes and effects of self-confidence have appeared in English-language publications describing characteristics of a sacrilegious attitude toward God, the character of the British empire, and the culture of colonial-era American society.

In 1890, the philosopher William James in his Principles of Psychology wrote:

Believe what is in the line of your needs, for only by such belief is the need fulfilled... Have faith that you can successfully make it, and your feet are nerved to its accomplishment.

With World War I, psychologists praised self-confidence as greatly decreasing nervous tension, allaying fear, and ridding the battlefield of terror; they argued that soldiers who cultivated a strong and healthy body would also acquire greater self-confidence while fighting. At the height of the temperance movement of the 1920s, psychologists associated self-confidence in men with remaining at home and taking care of the family when they were not working. During the Great Depression, academics Philip Eisenberg and Paul Lazarsfeld wrote that a sudden negative change in one's circumstances, especially a loss of a job, could lead to decreased self-confidence, but more commonly if the jobless person believes the fault of his unemployment is his. They also noted how if individuals do not have a job long enough, they become apathetic and lose all self-confidence.

In 1943, American psychologist Abraham Maslow argued in his paper "A Theory of Human Motivation" that an individual is only motivated to acquire self-confidence (one component of "esteem") after achieving what they need for physiological survival, safety, and love and belonging. He claimed that satisfaction with self-esteem led to feelings of self-confidence that, once attained, led to a desire for "self-actualization". As material standards of most people rapidly rose in developed countries after World War II and fulfilled their material needs, a plethora of widely cited academic research about confidence and related concepts like self-esteem and self-efficacy emerged.

== Research ==
=== Measures ===
One of the earliest measures of self-confidence was a 12-point scale, ranging from a minimum score for someone who is "timid and self-distrustful, shy, never makes decisions, self-effacing" to a maximum score for someone who is "able to make decisions, absolutely confident and sure of his own decisions and opinions". Some researchers have measured self-confidence as a simple construct divided into affective and cognitive components: anxiety as an affective aspect and self-evaluations of proficiency as a cognitive component. Other researchers have used body language proxies, rather than self-reports, to measure self-confidence by having examiners measure on a scale of 1 to 5 the subject's body language such as eye contact, fidgeting, posture, facial expressions, and gestures. There are various types that could affect the measure of one's confidence, such as the hard/easy effect, and overconfidence bias.

Some methods measure self-esteem and self-confidence in different settings, such as speaking in public spaces, academic performance, physical appearance, romantic relationships, social interactions, and athletic ability. In sports, researchers have measured athletes' confidence about winning upcoming matches and how sensitive respondents' self-confidence is to performance and negative feedback.

Abraham Maslow and others have emphasized the need to distinguish between self-confidence as a generalized personality characteristic and self-confidence concerning a specific task, ability, or challenge (i.e., self-efficacy). The term "self-confidence" typically refers to a general personality trait— in contrast, "self-efficacy" is defined by psychologist Albert Bandura as a "belief in one's ability to succeed in specific situations or accomplish a task".

=== Factors correlated with self-confidence ===
Various factors within and beyond an individual's control may affect their self-confidence. An individual's self-confidence can vary in different environments, such as at home or at school, and concerning different types of relationships and situations. When people attribute their success to a matter under their control, they are less likely to be confident about being successful in the future. If someone attributes their failure to a factor beyond their control, they are more likely to be confident about succeeding in the future. If a person believes they failed to achieve a goal because of a factor that was beyond their control, they are more likely to be more self-confident that they can achieve the goal in the future. One's self-confidence often increases as one satisfactorily completes particular activities. American social psychologist Leon Festinger found that self-confidence in an individual's ability may only rise or fall when that individual can compare themselves to others who are roughly similar, in a competitive environment.

A person can possess self-confidence in their ability to complete a specific task (self-efficacy)—e.g. cook a good meal or write a good novel—even though they may lack general self-confidence, or conversely be self-confident though they lack the self-efficacy to achieve a particular task. These two types of self-confidence are, however, correlated with each other, and for this reason, can be easily conflated.

Social psychologists have found self-confidence to be correlated with other psychological variables including saving money, influencing others, and being a responsible student. Self-confidence affects interest, enthusiasm, and self-regulation. Self-confidence is important for accomplishing goals and improving performance. Marketing researchers have found that the general self-confidence of a person is negatively correlated with their level of anxiety. Self-confidence increases a person's general well-being and one's motivation which often increases performance. It also increases one's ability to deal with stress and mental health. The more self-confident an individual is, the less likely they are to conform to the judgments of others. Higher confidence is correlated with individuals setting higher goals. When people face feelings of discontent because they do not accomplish a certain goal, people who have higher self-confidence may become even more persistent in accomplishing their goals, whereas those with low self-confidence are more prone to giving up quickly. Albert Bandura argued that a person's perceived confidence indicates capability. If people do not believe that they are capable of coping, they experience disruption which lowers their confidence about their performance. Salespeople who are high in self-confidence tend to set higher goals for themselves, which makes them more likely to stay employed, yield higher revenues, and generate higher customer service satisfaction. In certain fields of medical practice, patients experience a lack of self-confidence during the recovery period. This is commonly referred to as DSF or defectum sui fiducia from the Latin for lack of self-confidence. This can be the case after a stroke, when the patient refrains from using a weaker lower limb due to fear of it not being strong enough.

On the overconfidence effect, Martin Hilbert argues that confidence bias can be explained by a noisy conversion of objective evidence into subjective estimates, where noise is defined as the mixing of memories during the observing and remembering process. Dominic D. P. Johnson and James H. Fowler write that "overconfidence maximizes individual fitness and populations tend to become overconfident, as long as benefits from contested resources are sufficiently large compared with the cost of competition". In studies of implicit self-esteem, researchers have found that people may consciously overreport their levels of self-esteem. Inaccurate self-evaluation is commonly observed in healthy populations. In the extreme, large differences between one's self-perception and one's actual behaviour are a hallmark of several disorders that have important implications for understanding treatment-seeking and compliance. Overconfidence supports delusional thinking, such as frequently occurs in individuals with schizophrenia.

Whether a person, in making a decision, seeks out additional sources of information depends on their level of self-confidence specific to that area. As the complexity of a decision increases, a person is more likely to be influenced by another person and seek out additional information. Several psychologists suggest that self-confident people are more willing to examine evidence that both supports and contradicts their attitudes. Meanwhile, people who are less self-confident and more defensive may prefer attitudinal information over information that challenges their perspectives. When individuals with low self-confidence receive feedback from others, they are averse to receiving information about their relative ability and negative informative feedback, and not averse to receiving positive feedback. If new information about an individual's performance is negative feedback, this may interact with a negative affective state (low self-confidence) causing the individual to become demoralized, which in turn induces a self-defeating attitude that increases the likelihood of failure in the future more than if they did not lack self-confidence. People may be more self-confident about what they believe if they consult sources of information that agree with their world views. People may deceive themselves about their positive qualities and the negative qualities of others so that they can display greater self-confidence than they might otherwise feel, thereby enabling them to advance socially and materially.

=== Perceptions of self-confidence in others ===
People with high self-confidence are more likely to impress others, as others perceive them as more knowledgeable and more likely to make correct judgments. Despite this, a negative correlation is sometimes found between the level of their self-confidence and the accuracy of their claims. When people are uncertain and unknowledgeable about a topic, they are more likely to believe the testimony, and follow the advice of those that seem self-confident. However, expert psychological testimony on the factors that influence eyewitness memory appears to reduce juror reliance on self-confidence.

People prefer leaders with greater self-confidence over those with less self-confidence. Self-confident leaders tend to influence others through persuasion instead of resorting to coercive means. They are more likely to resolve issues by referring them to another qualified person or calling upon bureaucratic procedures, which avoid personal involvement. Others suggest that self-confidence does not affect leadership style but is only correlated with years of supervisory experience and self-perceptions of power.

== Variation in different groups ==
Social scientists have discovered that self-confidence operates differently in different categories of people.

=== Children and students ===
In children, self-confidence emerges differently than in adults. For example, only children as a group may be more self-confident than other children. If children are self-confident, they may be more likely to sacrifice immediate recreational time for possible rewards in the future, enhancing their self-regulatory capability. Successful performance of children in music increases feelings of self-confidence, increasing motivation for study. By adolescence, youth who have little contact with friends tend to have low self-confidence. In adolescents, low self-confidence may be a predictor of loneliness.

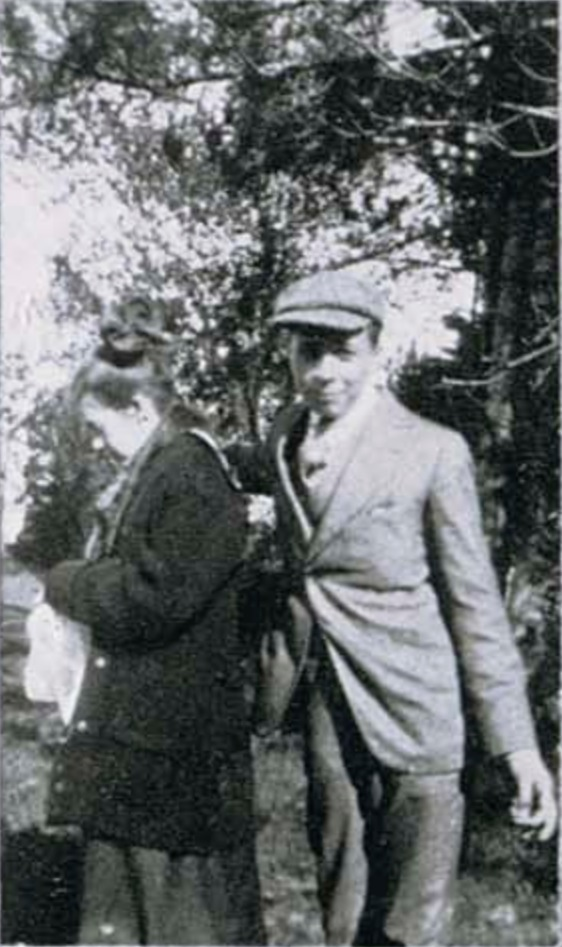
Photo captioned "Bashful" in a 1916–1917 yearbook, Sturgeon Bay, Wisconsin

In general, students who perform well have increased confidence, which likely in turn encourages them to take greater responsibility to complete tasks. Teachers affect the self-confidence of their students depending on how they treat them. Students who perform better receive more positive evaluation reports and have greater self-confidence. Characteristically low-achieving students report less confidence, while characteristically high-performing students report higher self-confidence. Extracurricular activities in school settings can boost confidence in students at earlier ages. These include participation in games or sports, visual and performing arts, and public speaking.

In a phenomenon known as stereotype threat, African American students perform more poorly on exams (relative to White American students) if they must reveal their racial identities before the exam. A similar phenomenon has been found in female students' performance (relative to male students) on math tests. The opposite has been observed in Asian Americans, whose confidence becomes tied up in expectations that they will succeed by both parents and teachers and who claim others perceive them as excelling academically more than they are.

Male university students may be more confident than their female counterparts. In regards to inter-ethnic interaction and language learning, those who engage more with people of different ethnicity and language become more self-confident in interacting with them.

=== Men and women ===
Women who are either high or low in general self-confidence are more likely to be persuaded to change their opinion than women with medium self-confidence. However, when specific high confidence (self-efficacy) is high, generalized confidence plays less of a role. Men who have low generalized self-confidence are more easily persuaded than men of high generalized self-confidence.

Women tend to respond less to negative feedback and be more averse to negative feedback than men. In experiments conducted by economists Muriel Niederle and Lise Vesterlund, the researchers found that male overconfidence and male preference for competition contributed to higher male participation in a competitive tournament scheme, while risk and feedback aversion played a negligible role. Some scholars partly attribute the fact of women being less likely to persist in engineering college than men to women's diminished sense of self-confidence.

More self-confident women may receive high-performance evaluations but not be as well-liked as men who engage in the same behaviour. Confident women may be considered a better job candidate than both men and women who behaved modestly. Male common stock investors trade 45% more than their female counterparts, which they attribute to greater recklessness (though also self-confidence) of men, reducing men's net returns by 2.65 percentage points per year versus women's 1.72 percentage points. Women report lower self-confidence levels than men in supervising subordinates.

One study found that women who viewed commercials with women in traditional gender roles appeared less self-confident in giving a speech than those who viewed commercials with women taking on more masculine roles. Such self-confidence may also be related to body image, as one study found a sample of overweight people in Australia and the US are less self-confident about their body's performance than people of average weight, and the difference is even greater for women than for men. Others found that if a newborn is separated from its mother upon delivery, the mother is less self-confident in her ability to raise that child than one who was not separated from her child. Furthermore, women who initially had low self-confidence are likely to experience a larger drop of self-confidence after separation from their children than women with relatively higher self-confidence. Heterosexual men who exhibit greater self-confidence relative to other men more easily attract single and partnered women.

=== Athletes ===
Self-confidence is one of the most influential factors in how well an athlete performs in a competition. In particular, "robust self-confidence beliefs" are correlated with aspects of mental toughness—the ability to cope better than one's opponents and remain focused under pressure. These traits enable athletes to "bounce back from adversity". When athletes confront stress while playing sports, their self-confidence decreases. However, feedback from their team members in the form of emotional and informational support reduces the extent to which stresses in sports reduce their self-confidence. At high levels of support, performance-related stress does not affect self-confidence. Among gymnasts, those who tend to talk to themselves in an instructional format tend to be more self-confident than those who do not. In a group, members' desire for success and confidence can also be related. Groups that had a higher desire for success did better in performance than groups with a weaker desire. The more frequently a group succeeded, the more interest they had in the activity and success.

=== Self-confidence in different cultures ===
The utility of self-confidence may vary by culture. Some find Asians perform better when they lack confidence, especially when compared to North Americans.

== Books ==
- The Confident Mind: A Battle-Tested Guide to Unshakable Performance by Dr. Nate Zinsser. Custom House (January 25, 2022)
- The Art Of Extraordinary Confidence: Your Ultimate Path To Love, Wealth, And Freedom by Dr. Aziz Gazipura PsyD. The Center For Social Confidence, May 10, 2016
- The Self-Confidence Workbook: A Guide to Overcoming Self-Doubt and Improving Self-Esteem by Barbara Markway, PhD, Celia Ampel, Teresa Flynn PhD. Callisto. October 23, 2018

== See also ==
- Assertiveness – Capacity of being self-assured without being aggressive to defend a point of view
- Credibility – Believability of a source or message
- Confidence trick, also known as Confidence game – Attempt to defraud a person or group
- Dunning–Kruger effect – Cognitive bias about one's own skill
- Emotional bias – Distortion in cognition
- Grandiose delusions – Subtype of delusion
- Haughtiness – Positive effect from the perceived value of a person
- Hubris – Extreme pride or overconfidence
- Icarus complex – Psychological complex
- Inner critic – Concept in psychology
- Law of attraction – Pseudoscientific belief
- Low self-esteem – Human emotional need
- Narcissism – Self-centered personality style
- Security – Degree of resistance to, or protection from, harm
- Self-serving bias – Distortion to enhance self-esteem, or to see oneself overly favorably
- Shyness – Feeling of apprehension, discomfort or awkwardness in the presence of other people
- Vanity – Excessive concern for one's own appearance or importance
