= Theories of political behavior =

Aspect of political science

Theories of political behavior, as an aspect of political science, attempt to quantify and explain the influences that define a person's political views, ideology, and levels of political participation, especially in relation to the role of politicians and their impact on public opinion. Political behavior is the subset of human behavior that involves politics and power. Theorists who have had an influence on this field include Karl Deutsch and Theodor Adorno.

== Long-term influences on political orientation ==
Interaction with the political views of parental figures is often thought of as the primary long-term influence on political orientation and willingness to take part in the political system.

Teachers and other educational authority figures are also often thought to have a significant impact on political orientation. During the 2003–2004 school year, In the United States, students spent an average of 180.4 days in primary and secondary education each year, with a school day being defined as approximately 6.7 class hours. This means that on average a student will spend around 1,208.68 hours in class each year. Post-secondary education appears to have an impact on both voting rates and political identification; as a study of 9,784,931 college students found that they voted at a rate of 68.5% in the 2016 Presidential Election compared to the average of 46.1% for citizens aged 18–29 who voted.

Peers also affect political orientation. Friends often, but not necessarily, have the advantage of being part of the same generation, which collectively develops a unique set of societal issues; Eric L. Dey has argued that "socialisation is the process through which individuals acquire knowledge, habits, and value orientations that will be useful in the future." The ability to relate on this common level is what fuels and enables future ideological growth.

Sociologists and political scientists debate the relationship between age and the formation of political attitudes. The impressionable years hypothesis postulates that political orientation is solidified during early adulthood. By contrast, the "increasing persistence hypothesis" posits that attitudes become less likely to change as individuals become older, while the "life-long openness hypothesis" proposes that the attitudes of individuals remain flexible regardless of age.

== Short-term influences on political orientation ==
Short-term factors also affect voting behavior; the media and the impact of individual election issues are among these factors. These factors differ from the long-term factors as they are often short-lived. However, they can be just as crucial in modifying political orientation. The ways in which these two sources are interpreted often relies on the individuals specific political ideology formed by the long-term factors.

Most political scientists agree that the mass media have a profound impact on voting behavior. One author asserts that "few would argue with the notion that the institutions of the mass media are important to contemporary politics ... in the transition to liberal democratic politics in the Soviet Union and Eastern Europe the media was a key battleground."

Second, there are election issues. These include campaign issues, debates and commercials. Election years and political campaigns can shift certain political behaviors based on the candidates involved, which have different degrees of effectiveness in influencing voters.

== The influence of social groups on political outcomes ==
Recently, some political scientists have been interested in many studies which aimed to analyze the relation between the behavior of social groups and the political outcomes. Some of the social groups included in their studies have been age demographics, gender, and ethnic groups. This can be understood through the lenses of pluralism or social identity theory.

For example, in U.S. politics, the effect of ethnic groups and gender has a great influence on the political outcomes. Hispanic Americans have a profound social impact on the political outcome of their vote and are emerging as a strong up-and-coming political force. The most noticeable increase in Hispanic American voting was in the 2000 presidential election, although the votes did not share a socially common political view at that time. In the 2006 election, the Hispanic American vote aided tremendously in the election of Florida Senator Mel Martinez, although in the 2004 presidential election, about 44% of Latin Americans voted for Republican President George W. Bush. However, Hispanic Americans have the lowest voting rate in the United States, with only 47.6% voting in the 2016 Presidential Election in the United States. Currently illegal immigration has been claiming the most attention and Hispanic Americans, although not unanimous, are concerned with the education, employment and deportation of illegal immigrants in the United States. Although the majority of Hispanic Americans vote for Democratic candidates, Cuban Americans are likely the most conservative of Latinos, with 54% of Cuban American voters casting ballots for Donald Trump in the 2016 Presidential Election, compared to an average of 35% of all Latinos who voted. Although this was represents a net decrease in support for the Republican Party among Cuban Americans, it continues a trend created by the exile of many Cubans after the Cuban Revolution.

African Americans have the second highest voting rates in the United States and even surpassed white voters in the 2008 Presidential Election, although this has declined in the 2016 Presidential Election. In the 2008 Presidential Election and 2012 Presidential election, African Americans voted overwhelmingly for Democratic candidate, Barack Obama. This trend of African Americans voting for candidates of the Democratic Party continued into the 2016 Presidential Election.

Women in the United States have, in the past 30 years, surpassed male voting rates, with the 2016 Presidential Election having a ratio between females and males of 52 to 48. This trend is often referred to as the Gender Gap and when combined with the tendency of women to vote for Democratic candidates, their effect on political outcomes is extremely important.

== Biology and political science ==
Interdisciplinary studies in biology and political science aim to identify correlates of political behavior with biological aspects, for example the linkage of biology and political orientation, but also with other aspects like partisanship and voting behavior. This field of study is typically referred to genopolitics although it is sometimes referred to as biopolitics, although the term also has other meanings originating from the work of Michel Foucault.

The study of possible genetic bases of political behavior has grown since the 1980s. The term genopolitics was coined by political scientist James Fowler in the early-2000s to describe research into identifying specific transporter/receptor genes responsible for ideological orientation beyond the sociopsychological realm of political socialisation.

Other research on genopolitics includes the article entitled "Do Genes Contribute to the “Gender Gap”" which also attempts to explore genetic influences between the sexes and whether or not they contribute to political preferences. The authors concluded that “the findings support the claim that the environment (social or other) cannot be used in isolation to explain behavior differences between males and females, nor can all differences in modern political behaviors between the sexes simply be attributed to genes or presumptions about primitive man."

== Political participation ==
Political scientists also aim to understand what drives individuals to participate in the democratic process, either by voting, volunteering for campaigns, signing petitions or protesting. Participation cannot always be explained by rational behavior. The voting paradox, for example, points out that it cannot be in a citizen's self-interest to vote because the effort it takes to vote will almost always outweigh the benefits of voting, particularly considering a single vote is unlikely to change an electoral outcome. Political scientists instead propose that citizens vote for psychological or social reasons. Studies show, for example, that individuals are more likely to vote if they see their friends have voted or if someone in their household has received a nudge to vote.

== Political psychology ==
Political psychology aims to explain political behavior through psychological analysis. Examples of theories include right-wing authoritarianism, social dominance orientation, and system justification theory.

== See also ==
- Political parties
- Identity politics
- Votebank
