= Christakis =

Christakis (Greek: Χρηστάκης) is a name of Greek origin and may refer to:

Surname

- Alexander Christakis (born 1937), Greek-American social scientist, systems scientist and cyberneticist
- Erika Christakis, American expert in early childhood education
- Georgios Christakis-Zografos (1863–1920), Greek politician
- Nicholas A. Christakis (born 1962), American physician and social scientist

Given name

- Christakis Charalambides (Stephanos of Tallinn, born 1940), primate of the Estonian Apostolic Orthodox Church
- Christakis Zografos (1820–1898), Greek banker
