= Three degrees of influence =

Social networks theory

Three degrees of influence is a theory in the realm of social networks, proposed by Nicholas A. Christakis and James H. Fowler in 2007. This argument is basically that peer effects need not stop at one degree of separation. Rather, across a broad set of empirical settings, using both observational and experimental methods, it has been observed that the effect seems, in many cases, to no longer be meaningful at a social horizon of three degrees of separation.

The theory has since been explored by scientists in numerous disciplines using diverse statistical, mathematical, psychological, sociological, and biological approaches. Numerous large-scale in-person and online experiments have documented this phenomenon in the intervening years.

Beginning in the early 2000's, Christakis and Fowler explored the impact of social connections on behavior, describing how social influence and social contagion do not end with the people to whom a person is directly connected. People influence their friends, who in turn influence their friends, and so on. Hence, a person's beliefs and actions can influence people they have never met, to whom they are only indirectly tied.

Using both observational and experimental methods, Christakis and Fowler examined diverse phenomena, such as obesity, happiness, cooperation, voting, and other behaviors and beliefs. Investigations by other groups subsequently explored many other phenomena in this way (such as crime, social learning, etc.).

In short, Christakis and Fowler posited that diverse phenomena "ripple through our network, having an impact on our friends (one degree), our friends' friends (two degrees), and even our friends' friends' friends (three degrees). Our influence gradually dissipates and ceases to have a noticeable effect on people beyond the social frontier that lies at three degrees of separation." They posited a number of reasons for this decay, and they offered informational, psychological, and biological rationales.

== Rationale ==
Influence might dissipate after roughly three degrees (to and from friends' friends' friends) for at least three reasons, Christakis and Fowler proposed:

1. Intrinsic decay—corruption of information, or a kind of "social friction" (like the game telephone).
2. Network instability—social ties become unstable (and are not constant across time) at a horizon of more than three degrees of separation.
3. Evolutionary purpose—we evolved in small groups where everyone was connected by three degrees or fewer and so we might not have the capacity to detect or respond to weak "signals" emanating from further away geodesically (an idea receiving subsequent support).

== Scientific literature ==
=== Initial research and statistical approach ===
Initial studies using observational data by Christakis and Fowler suggested that a variety of attributes (like obesity, smoking, happiness, loneliness, and alcohol consumption), rather than being individualistic, are casually correlated by contagion mechanisms that transmit such phenomena over long distances within social networks.

Certain subsequent analyses explored limitations to these analyses (subject to different statistical assumptions); or expressed concern that the statistical methods employed in these analyses could not fully control for other environmental factors; or noted that the statistical estimates arising from some approaches may not always have straightforward interpretations; or argued that the statistical methods may not always account for homophily processes in the creation and retention of relationships over time.

But other scholarship using sensitivity analysis found that the basic estimates regarding the transmissibility of obesity and smoking cessation, for example, are quite robust, or otherwise replicated or supported the findings, e.g., in the case of alcohol consumption. Additional, early, detailed modeling work showed that the generalized estimating equation (GEE) modeling approach used by Christakis and Fowler (and other groups) was quite effective for estimating social contagion effects and in distinguishing them from homophily; this paper concluded, "For network influence, we find that the approach appears to have excellent sensitivity, and quite good specificity with regard to distinguishing the presence or absence of such a 'network effect,' regardless of whether or not homophily is present in network formation." Another methodological paper concluded that it is indeed possible to bound estimates of peer effects even given the modeling constraints faced by Christakis and Fowler —even if parametric assumptions are otherwise required to identify such effects using observational data (if substantial unobserved homophily is thought to be present). Further support for the GEE modeling approach used by Christakis and Fowler also appeared. And the notion of the social contagion of obesity was used in a confirmatory mathematical model in 2018.

Additional analytic approaches to observational data have also been supportive, including matched sample estimation, and reshuffling techniques. The reshuffling technique validated the "edge directionality test" as an identification strategy for causal peer effects; this technique was first proposed by Christakis and Fowler as a tool for estimating such effects in network analysis in their 2007 obesity paper.

Sophisticated computational models have also documented the origins and nature and limitations of the three-degrees-of-influence rule, including an application to the problem of loneliness, distinguishing homophily from induction (including via emotional, behavioral, and cognitive contagion).

Another sophisticated analysis (using observational data from the National Longitudinal Study of Adolescent to Adult Health) published in Science in 2026 and referring to the classic papers by Christakis and Fowler from nearly 20 years earlier, explicitly evaluated influence cascades of smoking behavior and confirmed both the decay with geodesic distance and the horizon of three degrees (the paper also analyzed how different targeting algorithms and fractions affected population-wide spread).

From a theoretical perspective, it has been shown that the three-degrees-of-influence property naturally emerges as the outcome of the interplay between social influence, or learning dynamics, and complex networks. These studies employed emblematic models to study the diffusion of information, opinions, ideas and behaviors on a wide range of network topologies, showing also under which conditions violations of the "three degrees of influence" can be expected.

The phenomenon has also been noted using observational data regarding criminal networks, including by sociologists and economists. A 2023 paper referenced the principle to document the spread of attention to scientific papers online to a "depth" of three degrees and beyond. A 2024 paper observed that when scientists are accused of sexual misconduct, their (and their co-authors' and their co-authors' co-authors') citations decline thereafter.

Christakis and Fowler reviewed critical and supportive findings regarding the three degrees of influence phenomenon and the analytic approaches used to discern it with observational data in 2013.

=== Experiments confirming the theory ===
There have been many subsequent experimental studies (by many research groups, including Christakis and Fowler and their other collaborators). These studies have found strong causal evidence of contagion processes that spread beyond dyads (including out to two, three, or four degrees of separation) using randomized controlled experiments.

An early 2010 paper by Christakis and Fowler documented, using an in-person experiment, that cooperation behavior can cascade to three degrees of separation. A 2012 experiment involved 61,000,000 people who used Facebook and it showed the spread of voting behavior out to two degrees of separation. A 2014 paper confirmed the spread of emotions beyond dyads, as proposed in 2008 by Christakis and Fowler, using another massive online experiment. An RCT of 24,702 people in 176 villages in Honduras (published in Science by Edo Airoldi and Christakis in 2024) documented the spread of exogenously introduced maternal and child health knowledge and practices to two degrees of separation (among other findings related to different targeting algorithms and percentages).

A 2011 paper by economists Carrell, Hoekstra, and West, exploited random assignment of peers in the United States Air Force Academy and found "statistically significant positive peer effects that are roughly half as large as the own effect of prior fitness on current fitness. Evidence suggests that the effects are caused primarily by friends who were the least fit, thus supporting the provocative notion that poor physical fitness spreads on a person-to-person basis" (roughly in keeping with estimates by Christakis and Fowler).

The theory has also been used by computer scientists and mathematicians in order to develop validated algorithms for efficient influence maximization; to assess opinion dynamics that reflect the impact of individuals more than one degree of separation from an ego; and as a basis for "agent based simulation of the Christakis-Fowler Social Model."

=== Mechanism ===
Diverse lines of work have also explored the specific biopsychosocial mechanisms for the boundedness of contagion effects, some of which had been theorized by Christakis and Fowler. Experiments by Moussaid et al. evaluated the spread of risk perception, and documented inflection at approximately three degrees. Another set of experiments documented the impact of information distortion, noting that "despite strong social influence within pairs of individuals, the reach of judgment propagation across a chain rarely exceeded a social distance of three to four degrees of separation.... We show that information distortion and the overweighting of other people's errors are two individual-level mechanisms hindering judgment propagation at the scale of the chain." And experiments with fMRI scans in a sociocentrically mapped network of graduate students, published in 2018, showed that neural responses to conceptual stimuli were similar between friends, with a nadir at three degrees of separation, providing further biological evidence for this theory.

== Moral implications ==
The idea of network influence raises the question of free will, because it suggests that people are influenced by factors which they cannot control and which they are not aware of. Christakis and Fowler claim in their book, Connected, that policy makers should use knowledge about social network effects and social contagion in order to optimize public policy. This applies to many aspects of life, from public health to economics. For instance, when resources are scarce, they note that it might be preferable to immunize individuals located in the center of a network in preference to structurally peripheral individuals. Or, it might be much more effective to motivate clusters of people to avoid criminal behavior than to act upon individuals or than to punish each criminal separately. Their own randomized controlled field trials have explored how to use social contagion to foster the spread of desirable innovations in rural villages.

Nobel Prize laureate Maria Ressa has said that her exposure to this concept was instrumental in her establishment of Rappler: "Actually part of what drove me during that time period, and this was also important in the formation and how we created Rappler, was the Framingham heart study here in Massachusetts. Because one of the Harvard professors, Nicholas Christakis and James Fowler, who's now I think at USC, they wrote this book where they took the Framingham heart study, and they proved that things, emotions, ideas, actions spread through three degrees of influence. So they called it the three degrees of influence rule."

== See also ==
- Six degrees of separation
- The Tipping Point
