= Neuropolitics =

Interdisciplinary field of study

Neuropolitics is a science which investigates the interplay between the brain and politics. It combines work from a variety of scientific fields which includes neuroscience, political science, psychology, behavioral genetics, primatology, and ethology. Often, neuropolitics research borrow methods from cognitive neuroscience to investigate classic questions from political science such as how people make political decisions, form political / ideological attitudes, evaluate political candidates, and interact in political coalitions. However, another line of research considers the role that evolving political competition has had on the development of the brain in humans and other species. The research in neuropolitics often intersects with work in genopolitics, political psychology, political physiology, sociobiology, neuroeconomics, and neurolaw.

== History ==
Philosophers, including Plato and John Locke, have long theorized about the nature of human thought and used these theories as a basis for their political philosophy. In Locke's view, humans entered the world with a mind that was a blank slate and formed governments as a result of the necessities imposed by the state of nature. Though Locke was trained in medicine, he became skeptical about the value of anatomical studies of the brain and concluded that no useful insights about mental faculties could be developed by studying it.

Roger Sperry and colleagues performed the first published neuropolitics experiment in 1979 with split-brain patients who had their corpus-callosum severed and thus had two brain hemispheres with severely impaired communication. The researchers showed photos of political figures to each of the patients' eyes (and thus each distinct brain hemisphere) separately and asked them to give a "thumbs up" or "thumbs down" evaluation. Both hemispheres were shown to be capable of rendering a political attitude about the people they were viewing. For instance, Adolf Hitler and Fidel Castro were given a thumbs down, while Winston Churchill was given a thumbs up, and Richard Nixon was given a thumb in the neutral position (the experiments were carried out prior to full revelation of the Watergate scandal.) Each hemisphere attempted to communicate clues about the identity of the individuals to the other hemisphere. This study demonstrated that neurological approaches could inform researchers' understanding of political attitudes.

Frans de Waal's first book in 1982, Chimpanzee Politics, suggested that the brains of non-human primates like chimpanzees enabled them to engage in complex and elaborate societal maneuvers. This "Machiavellian intelligence" facilitated the formation of coalitions and political dynamics with many analogues to human politics. Later work by Robin Dunbar suggested a relationship between the size of an animal's neo-cortex and the size of the social group it could successfully manage. While Aristotle's Politics compared the mental faculties of humans to other animals in trying to establish a foundation for understanding human politics, the systematic work of de Waal and Dunbar brought rigorous methods for illuminating the relationship between the brain and politics, even across distantly related species.

== Neuroimaging ==
The advent of functional magnetic resonance imaging gave a new set of tools to neuroscience that could be used to investigate questions that were difficult or impossible to address previously. The first neuropolitics studies using fMRI looked at the differences in brain activity between people who were knowledgeable about national politics and those who were not, while they answered political questions. Following in the tradition of work by Philip Converse and John Zaller, it found that the politically knowledgeable had elevated levels of activity in the default mode network of the brain while political novices had diminished activity in the same areas. A subsequent study by Drew Westen and colleagues confirmed the elevated default mode network activity for political sophisticates and suggested differences between Republicans and Democrats in how they think about political questions. Westen later expanded on his findings and their implications for political campaigns in his book The Political Brain.

David Amodio and colleagues measured event-related potential (ERP) for a set of liberal and conservative participants while they performed a go/no go task and found that greater liberalism was associated with stronger conflict-related anterior cingulate activity. In 2011, Ryota Kanai's group at University College London found differences in the size of particular brain regions corresponded with whether the participants were more liberal or more conservative.

== Politics in other species ==
Despite the risks of anthropomorphizing the behaviors of non-human animals, researchers have investigated the politics of a number of social species. In addition to de Waals' work on chimpanzees, scientists have investigated the dynamics of coalitions in hyenas, dolphins, elephants, and other animals. In the spotted hyena, for instance, social interactions are characterized by a fission-fusion society in which groups of hyenas can form and dissolve on a regular basis. The greater complexity of the political dynamics among the spotted hyena appears to require a larger neocortex than in related species with simpler social structures. Dolphins have been shown to exhibit changing multilevel political alliances that appear to put substantial demands on their social cognition. And, elephants exhibit different coalitional dynamics in the different levels of their societal organization. Considering the relationships among neuroanatomy, mental function, and political dynamics in other species can inform our understanding of the politics in humans and the role that our brain plays in our politics.

== See also ==
- Biology and political science
- Biology and political orientation
- Political psychology
