= Dominic Johnson =

Dominic Johnson may refer to:

- Dominic Johnson, Baron Johnson of Lainston (born 1974), British financier, hedge fund manager and politician
- Dominic Johnson (pole vaulter) (born 1975), Saint Lucian pole vaulter and decathlete
- Dominic D. P. Johnson, British academic
