= John Hibbing =

American political scientist

John R. Hibbing
- Born: December 31, 1953 (age 72)
- Education: Dana College (B.A., 1976); University of Iowa (M.A., 1978; Ph.D., 1980)
- Known for: Biology and political orientation Political psychology
- Awards: Guggenheim Fellowship (2013)
- Scientific career
- Fields: Political science
- Institutions: University of Nebraska–Lincoln
- Thesis: Retired from the House: The Causes and Consequences of Voluntary Retirement from the U.S. House of Representatives (1980)

John Richard Hibbing (born December 31, 1953) is an American political scientist and was the former Foundation Regents University Professor in the Department of Political Science at the University of Nebraska–Lincoln. He is known for his research on the biological and psychological correlates of political ideology. With Kevin B. Smith and John R. Alford, Hibbing is the co-author of Predisposed: Liberals, Conservatives, and the Biology of Political Differences, published by Routledge in 2013.

He is a fellow of the American Association for the Advancement of Science since 2012, and received a Guggenheim Fellowship in 2013.

== Career ==
=== University of Nebraska–Lincoln ===
In 1981, Hibbing joined the University of Nebraska–Lincoln as an Assistant Professor in the Department of Political Science. He was promoted to Associate Professor in 1985, Primary Professor in 1990, and named the Foundation Regents University Professor of the Department of Political Science in 2001. In April, 2023, the university announced Hibbing would lecture for a final time on May 3, 2023. Following this lecture, he retired from the university, continuing his research and updates of personal published content.
