= Biology and political science =

Interdisciplinary field integrating biology and politics

The interdisciplinary study of biology and political science is the application of theories and methods from the field of biology toward the scientific understanding of political behavior. The field is sometimes called biopolitics, a term that will be used in this article as a synonym although it has other, less related meanings. More generally, the field has also been called "politics and the life sciences".

== History ==
During the 19th century, some scholars and philosophers made attempts to apply concepts derived from the natural sciences in the understanding of society and politics. This was greatly influenced by positivism and Darwinism.

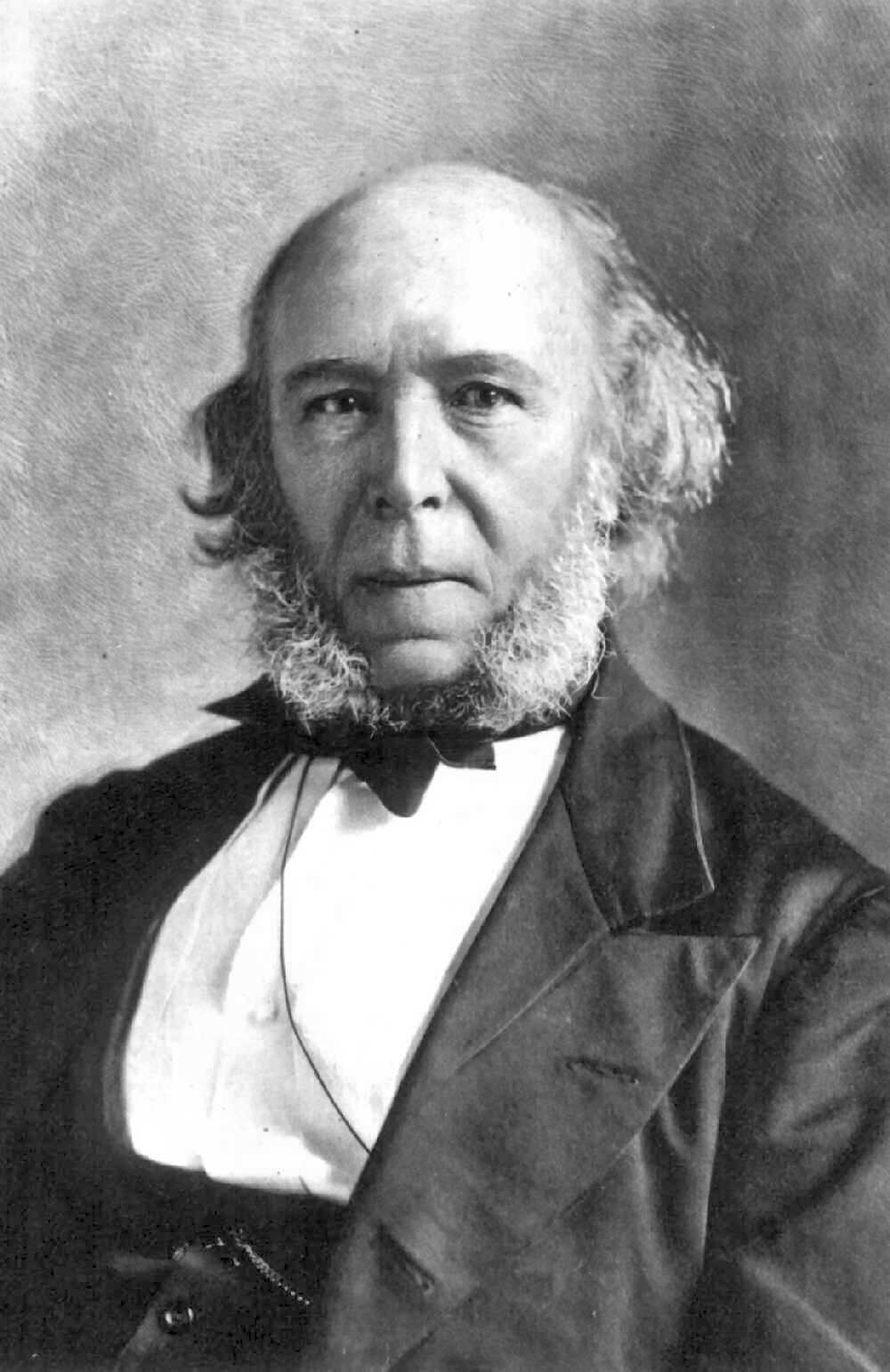
English polymath, Herbert Spencer, who coined the expression "survival of the fittest", in Principles of Biology (1864)

In The Social Organism (1860), Herbert Spencer compares society fo a living organism, he states that just like biological species evolve through natural selection, societies evolve through analogous processes.

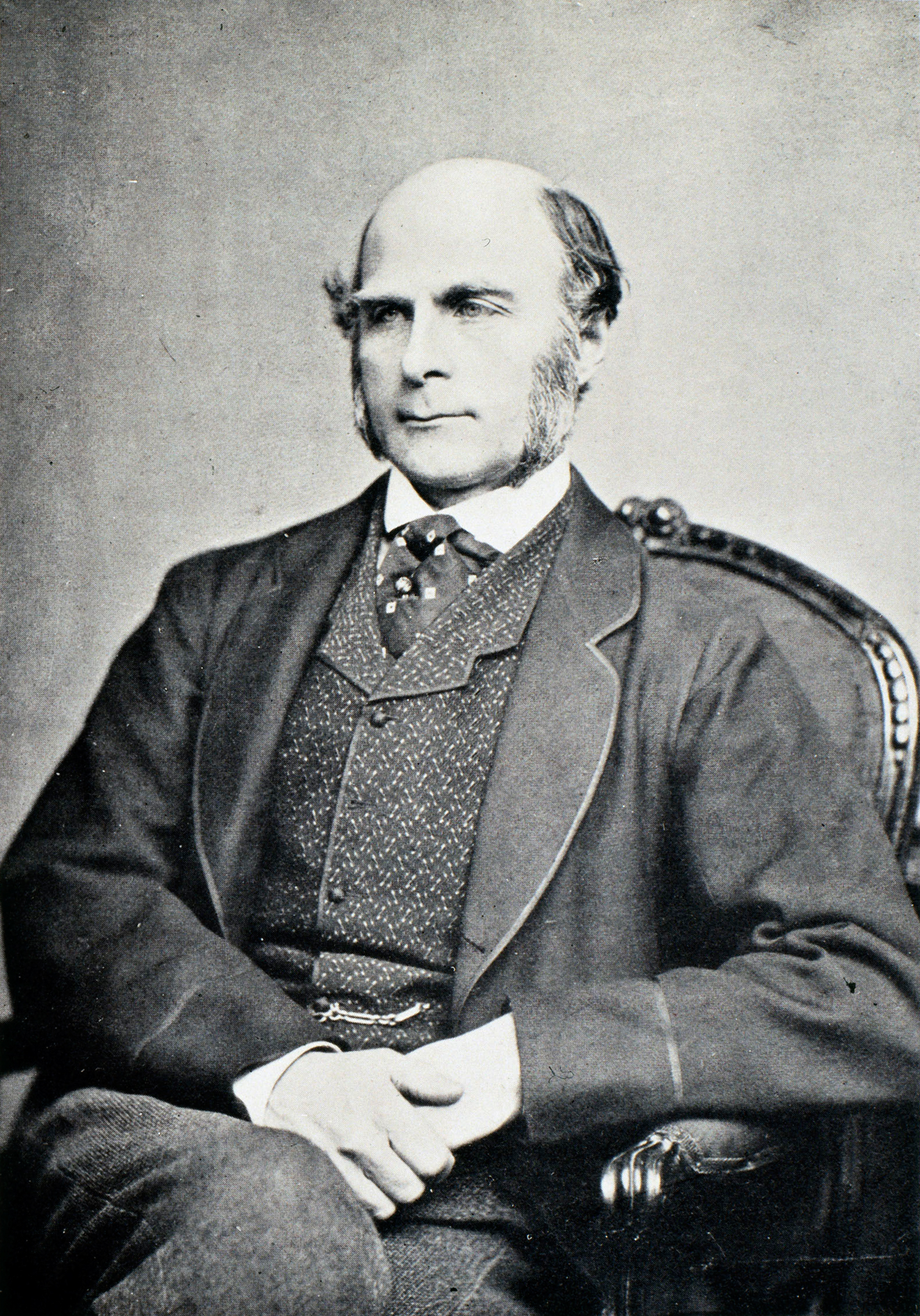
Francis Galton, whose ideas became the basis of behavioural genetics.

Another proponent of Social Darwinism, was Francis Galton, Darwin's nephew, whose ideas were the basis of behaviourial genetics and eugenics. He claimed that mental qualities (genius and talent), just like physical traits, where inherited among generations of people. He claimed that society should change so that heredity was a conscious decision, to avoid both over-breeding by less fit members of society and the under-breeding of the more fit ones. In Galton's view, social institutions such as welfare and insane asylums allowed inferior humans to survive and reproduce faster than the superior humans in respectable spheres of society.

Many scholars link social darwinism to the appearance of "scientific racism", and thus it is considered a possible influence for Nazism and other genocidal regimes.

Friedrich Ratzel considered that states, just like organisms need to expand or perish, he coined the term Lebensraum, which the Third Reich used as justification for its expansionism.

Rudolf Kjellén, as Ratzel's student, would continue his work on organic state theory, coining the term geopolitics

The field can be said to originate with the 1968 manifesto of Albert Somit, Towards a more Biologically Oriented Political Science, which appeared in the Midwest Journal of Political Science. The term "biopolitics" was appropriated for this area of study by Thomas Thorton, who used it as the title of his 1970 book.

The Association for Politics and the Life Sciences was formed in 1981 and exists to study the field of biopolitics as a subfield of political science. APLS owns and publishes an academic peer-reviewed journal called Politics and the Life Sciences (PLS). The journal is edited in the United States at the University of Maryland, College Park’s School of Public Policy, in Maryland.

By the late 1990s and since, biopolitics research has expanded rapidly, especially in the areas of evolutionary theory, genetics, and neuroscience.

The historical link between biology and politics on the one hand, and sociological organicism on the other, is inescapable. The essential difference here is that the early modern application of biological ideas to politics revolved around the idea that society was a ‘social organism’, whereas the subject this article describes expressly sets out to separate the essential logic of the association of biology to human social life, from this earlier model. Hence the emphasis upon ‘politics’, denoting the primacy of the individual who engages in social life, as in political behaviour, underpinned by biological foundations. In this sense the rise of Biopolitics represents the replacement of sociological organicism that had been eradicated by the end of the Second World War, with an acceptable form of political organicism. Some discussion bearing on this point may be found in Biology and Politics : Recent Explorations by Albert Somit, 1976, which is a collection of essays, one brief essay by William Mackenzie is Biopolitics : A Minority Viewpoint, in which he talks about the ‘founding father’ of Biopolitics as being Morley Roberts, because of his 1938 book of that name. But Roberts was not using the term in its modern, politically sanitized sense, but in the context of society viewed as a true living being, a social organism. And in a reply to Somit's Towards a more Biologically Oriented Political Science, published in the same journal, we find Some Questions about a More Biologically Oriented Political Science by Jerone Stephens, which sets out to warn against lurching back into the errors of previous venturers into the realms of biology and politics, as in sociological organicism.

== Topics ==
Topics addressed in political science from these perspectives include: public opinion and criminal justice attitudes, political ideology, (e.g. the correlates of biology and political orientation), origins of party systems, voting behavior, and warfare. Debates persist inside the field and out, regarding genetic and biological determinism. Important recent surveys of leading research in biopolitics have been published in the journals Political Psychology and Science.

== See also ==
- Biology and political orientation
- Genopolitics
- Moral psychology
- Neuropolitics
- Political psychology
- Sociobiology
