= John R. Alford =

American academic

- Education: University of Houston; University of Iowa
- Known for: Genopolitics
- Awards: CQ Press Award from the American Political Science Association (1988; with John R. Hibbing)
- Scientific career
- Fields: Political science
- Institutions: Rice University
- Thesis: Party Strength in the Electorate and Congress (1981)

John R. Alford is a political science professor at Rice University, known for his research with John R. Hibbing in the field of genopolitics. He has also testified as an expert witness in several court cases pertaining to Congressional redistricting in Texas.
