= Luis Lobo-Guerrero =

International relations and history scholar

Luis Lobo-Guerrero (born 21 August 1976) is (full) professor of History and Theory of International Relations at the University of Groningen. Since 2023 has been Head of Department of International Relations and International Organisations, and between 2016 and 2023, director of the Centre for International Relations Research at the same university.

== Career ==
Lobo-Guerrero has worked mainly in the field of International Relations with a specific interest in post-structuralist thought, history of early modern science, historical epistemology, and geopolitics. He has worked on the politics of international security focussing on the role of insurance as a technology for governing uncertainty. He has been a key proponent of the idea of biopolitics of security as an approach that features life as the referent object of security analysis. Currently, he works on the ideas and practices that made it possible to think about the global in the 16th century, and in so doing, explores how globality can be understood as a connectivity effect.

== Publications ==
Monographs

Insuring Life: Value, Security and Risk (London: Routledge, 2016).

Insuring War: Sovereignty, Security and Risk (London: Routledge, 2013).

Insuring Security: Biopolitics, Security and Risk (London: Routledge, 2012).

Edited volumes

Mapping, Connectivity, and the Making of European Empires. Luis Lobo-Guerrero, Laura Lo Presti, and Filipe dos Reis, eds. (London: Rowman and Littlefield, forthcoming 2021).

Imaginaries of Connectivity – the creation of novel spaces of governance, Lobo-Guerrero, Luis, Suvi Alt, and Maarten Meijer, eds. (London: Rowman and Littlefield, 2019)
