= Impressionable years hypothesis =

The impressionable years hypothesis is a theory of political psychology that posits that individuals form durable political attitudes and party affiliations during late adolescence and early adulthood. In United States political history, the theory has been used to explain the waxing and waning in the strength of the two major political parties. The theory has also been applied outside of the United States.

== Hypothesis ==
According to the impressionable years hypothesis, the historical environment has an important socializing influence on individuals of entire generations, and individuals within these generations thus tend to share values and attitudes compared to individuals within other generations. Under the strictest definition of this hypothesis, attitudes remain fixed in individuals after they exit their early adulthood. Political change thus happens primarily through a process known as cohort replacement, in which a generation dies out and is replaced by another generation. Two theories contrast to the impressionable years hypothesis. The "increasing persistence hypothesis" posits that attitudes become less likely to change as individuals become older, while the "life-long openness hypothesis" proposes that the attitudes of individuals remain flexible regardless of age.

An influential 1928 essay by Karl Mannheim proposed that political leanings were heavily influenced by the historical context of an individual's youth. Another early exploration of the idea began in the 1930s under the direction of Theodore Newcomb. In the Bennington College Study, Newcomb tracked the political attitudes of a cohort of female students attending Bennington College. In follow-up interviews conducted decades later, Newcomb found that the previously-conservative women had retained liberal political attitudes that they had first gained at Bennington.

== United States ==
Polling and analyses by Gallup, the Pew Research Center, and other sources have found that year of birth is an important predictor of political affiliation. For example, Baby boomers born during the early-to-mid 1950s tend to be significantly more Democratic-leaning than those born earlier or later. These Baby Boomers entered adulthood in the late 1960s and early 1970s, a period which saw the liberalization of American social views. By contrast, younger Boomers who came of age during the stagflation and tax revolts of the late 1970s have tended to favor the Republican Party.

According to a 2014 model developed by Catalist and Columbia University, presidential approval ratings inform voting behaviors for decades. The model works best with white voters, as black voters have tended to more consistently vote for Democratic candidates, and there is less data available for the remaining demographic groups. According to the model, popular presidents such as Dwight D. Eisenhower can leave lasting impressions on voters in their young adulthood. The model estimates that events that occur between the ages of 14 and 24 are the most important in determining an individual's political attitudes, though those attitudes continue to change after age 24. A separate model developed by Professor Dan Hopkins found that the political affiliation of a given individual was strongly affected by the popularity of presidents when that individual turned 18 years old.

=== New Deal coalition in the South ===
Osborne et al. use the theory to partially explain the decline of the Democratic Party and the New Deal coalition in the South. According to their theory, the events of the civil rights movement were extremely unpopular among white Southerners and the support of national Democratic leadership for the civil rights movement alienated white Southerners from the party. While older Southern voters resisted changes to their political affiliations and attitudes, younger voters moved to the Republican Party. As, older, Democratic voters died out, the Republican Party became the dominant party in the South.

== Outside the United States ==
The impressionable years hypothesis has also been explored in other countries. A 2002 study by James Tilley found that individuals in the United Kingdom who came of age during the 1920s, 1950s, and 1980s tended to more strongly support the Conservative Party, which was dominant during those decades. A 2004 study in Algeria found that most generations were not strongly affected by the circumstances of their youth, with some exceptions regarding certain attitudes in certain generations.

== See also ==
- Theories of political behavior
- Postmaterialism
