= Genopolitics =

Study of genetic basis of political behavior and attitudes

Genopolitics is the study of the genetic basis of political behavior and attitudes. It combines behavior genetics, psychology, and political science and it is closely related to the emerging fields of neuropolitics (the study of the neural basis of political attitudes and behavior) and political physiology (the study of biophysical correlates of political attitudes and behavior).

In 2008, The Chronicle of Higher Education reported on the increase in academicians' recognition of and engagement in genopolitics as a discrete field of study, and New York Times Magazine included genopolitics in its "Eighth Annual Year in Ideas" for the same year, noting that the term was originally coined by James Fowler. Critics of genopolitics have argued that it is "a fundamentally misguided undertaking", and that it is inconsistent with evidence in the fields of genetics, neuroscience, and evolutionary biology.

== Twin studies of political attitudes ==
Psychologists and behavior geneticists began using twin studies in the 1980s to study variation in social attitudes, and these studies suggested that both genes and environment played a role. In particular, Nick Martin and his colleagues published an influential twin study of social attitudes in Proceedings of the National Academy of Sciences in 1986.

However, this early work did not specifically analyze whether or not political orientations were heritable, and political scientists remained mostly unaware of the heritability of social attitudes until 2005. In that year, the American Political Science Review published a reanalysis of political questions on Martin's social attitude survey of twins in that the suggested liberal and conservative ideology is heritable. The article sparked considerable debate between critics, the authors and their defenders.

A more recent analysis of multiple twin studies finds that political views are approximately 40 percent heritable.

== Twin studies of political behavior ==
Initial twin studies suggested that predispositions toward espousal of certain political ideas are heritable, but they said little about political behavior (patterns of voting and/or activism) or predispositions toward it. A 2008 article published in the American Political Science Review matched publicly available voter registration records to a twin registry in Los Angeles, analyzed self-reported voter turnout in the National Longitudinal Study of Adolescent Health (Add Health), and studied other forms of political participation. In all three cases, both genes and environment contributed significantly to variation in political behavior.

However, other studies showed that the decision to affiliate with any political party and the strength of this attachment are significantly influenced by genes.

== Gene association studies ==
=== Candidate genes ===
Scholars therefore recently turned their attention to specific genes that might be associated with political behaviors and attitudes. In the first-ever research to link specific genes to political phenotypes, a direct association was established between voter turnout and monoamine oxidase A (MAO-A) and a gene–environment interaction between turnout and the serotonin transporter (5HTT) gene among those who frequently participated in religious activities. In other research scholars have also found an association between voter turnout and a dopamine receptor (DRD2) gene that is mediated by a significant association between that gene and the tendency to affiliate with a political party. More recent studies show an interaction between friendships and the dopamine receptor (DRD4) gene that is associated with political ideology. Although this work is preliminary and needs replication, it suggests that neurotransmitter function has an important effect on political behavior.

The candidate genes approach to genopolitics received substantial criticism in a 2012 article, published in the American Political Science Review, which argued that many of the candidate genes identified in the above research are associated with innumerable traits and behaviors. The degree to which these genes are associated with so many outcomes thus undermines the apparent important of evidence linking a gene to any particular outcome.

=== Linkage analysis ===
Employing a more general approach, researchers used genome-wide linkage analysis to identify chromosomal regions associated with political attitudes assessed using scores on a liberalism-conservativism scale. Their analysis identified several significant linkage peaks and the associated chromosomal regions implicate a possible role for NMDA and glutamate related receptors in forming political attitudes. However, this role is speculative as linkage analysis cannot identify the effect of individual genes.

=== Other explanations ===
Associations between genetic markers and political behavior are often assumed to predict a causal connection between the two. Scholars have little incentive to be skeptical of this presumed causal link. Yet it is possible that a confounding factor exists which makes the genetic relationship with politics purely correlative. For instance work on Irish parties, which shows some evidence of a genetic basis for the otherwise inexplicable distinction between the historically two main parties there, is also and more easily explained by socialization.

== See also ==
- Biology and political science, sometimes called biopolitics
- Biology and political orientation
