= The Importance of Being Little =

2016 book by Erika Christakis

- Author: Erika Christakis
- Subject: Early childhood
- Published: 2016 (Viking Press)
- Pages: 400
- ISBN: 978-0-525-42907-4

The Importance of Being Little: What Preschoolers Really Need from Grownups is a 2016 book written by early childhood educator Erika Christakis that argues the importance of separating childhood from adulthood. It was published by Viking Press.
