= James H. Fowler =

American social scientist (born 1970)

- Fowler at Poptech in 2009
- Born: February 18, 1970 (age 56)
- Education: Harvard University (1992, 2001, 2003); Yale University (1997)
- Known for: Obesity contagiousness Happiness contagiousness Genopolitics; Genes and Social Networks; Colbert bump
- Scientific career
- Fields: Social network analysis Cooperation; Political participation Genopolitics
- Workplaces: University of California, San Diego; University of California, Davis

James H. Fowler (born February 18, 1970) is an American social scientist specializing in social networks, cooperation, political participation, and genopolitics (the study of the genetic basis of political behavior). He is currently Professor of Medical Genetics in the School of Medicine and Professor of Political Science in the Division of Social Science at the University of California, San Diego. He was named a 2010 Fellow of the John Simon Guggenheim Foundation.

== Background ==
Fowler earned a bachelor's degree from Harvard College in 1992, a master's degree in International Relations from Yale University in 1997, and a Ph.D. in Government from the Harvard University in 2003. He was also a Peace Corps volunteer in Ecuador from 1992 to 1994. In 2010, he was named by Foreign Policy magazine to its list of top global thinkers.

== Research ==
Fowler's research centers on social networks. He is best known for his studies of the social spread of obesity, smoking, and happiness in the Framingham Heart Study, but he has also studied the network of legislative cosponsorships in the U.S. Congress and the network of U.S. Supreme Court precedents.

Studies by Nicholas A. Christakis and Fowler suggested a variety of individuals' attributes like obesity, smoking cessation, and happiness rather than being individualistic, are causally correlated by contagion mechanisms that transmit these behaviors over long distances within social networks. A debate over the statistical models used to establish these three degrees of influence findings ensued, but subsequent studies have found evidence of their central claims about behavioral influence and contagion.

In addition to his research on social networks, Fowler has become known for his work on genopolitics, showing that genes influence voting and other forms of political participation. Fowler used twin studies of voter turnout in Los Angeles and the National Longitudinal Study of Adolescent Health to establish that the decision to vote in the United States has very strong heritability. He has also identified three genes that are associated with voter turnout and partisan attachment, specifically those regulating the serotonin and dopamine systems in the brain via the production of monoamine oxidase, 5HTT, and DRD2.

More recently, he has shown evidence that social networks have a partly genetic basis. In 2010, he published a paper regarding the use of social networks as 'sensors' for forecasting epidemics.

In other research, Fowler is known for his theoretical and experimental work on egalitarianism and the evolution of cooperation, with related work on altruism, overconfidence, and political participation.

Fowler's newest research focuses on Facebook friendship as a predictor of voter mobilization, and the use of the social network medium, to mobilize voters in American elections. Based on a large manipulation of friendship cues in the Facebook social network, Fowler demonstrates that being presented with indications of friends having voted is a strong predictor of individual voting.

== Books ==
In September 2009, Little, Brown & Co. published Connected: The Surprising Power of Our Social Networks and How They Shape Our Lives by Nicholas A. Christakis and James H. Fowler. Connected draws on previously published and unpublished studies, including the Framingham Heart Study and makes several new conclusions about the influence of social networks on human health and behavior. In Connected, they put forward their "three degrees of influence" rule about human behavior, which theorizes that each person's individual social influence stretches three degrees before it fades out.

== The Colbert Report ==
On February 28, 2008, the Los Angeles Times published an op-ed that summarized Fowler's research showing that Democratic candidates who come on The Colbert Report receive 44% more in campaign donations in the first 30 days after appearing on the show. Colbert pointed out the op-ed on his March 3, 2008 show. Fowler also appeared during the Threatdown on his December 10, 2008 show, describing his work on the spread of happiness in social networks, and again on the January 7th, 2010 show to discuss the sociological impact of social networking.

== Selected publications ==
- Fowler, James H. and Hill, Seth and Levin, Remy and Obradovich, Nicholas (13 April 2020). "The Effect of Stay-at-Home Orders on COVID-19 Infections in the United States (4/13/2020)". arXiv:2004.06098. doi:10.2139/ssrn.3576826. S2CID 219073082.

The Framingham Heart Study Social Network

- Fowler, J. H.; Christakis, N. A (3 January 2009). "Dynamic Spread of Happiness in a Large Social Network: Longitudinal Analysis Over 20 Years in the Framingham Heart Study" (PDF). British Medical Journal. 337 (768) a2338. doi:10.1136/bmj.a2338. PMC 2600606. PMID 19056788. Archived from the original (PDF) on 25 March 2009.
- Christakis, N. A.; Fowler, JH (22 May 2008). "The Collective Dynamics of Smoking in a Large Social Network" (PDF). New England Journal of Medicine. 358 (21): 2249–2258. doi:10.1056/NEJMsa0706154. PMC 2822344. PMID 18499567. Archived from the original (PDF) on 8 September 2008.
- Christakis, N. A.; Fowler, JH (26 July 2007). "The Spread of Obesity in a Large Social Network Over 32 Years" (PDF). New England Journal of Medicine. 357 (4): 370–379. doi:10.1056/NEJMsa066082. PMID 17652652. Archived from the original (PDF) on 11 September 2008.
- Cacioppo, J. T.; Fowler, JH; Christakis, NA (December 2009). "Alone in the Crowd: The Structure and Spread of Loneliness in a Large Social Network" (PDF). Journal of Personality and Social Psychology. 97 (6): 977–991. doi:10.1037/a0016076. PMC 2792572. PMID 19968414. Archived from the original (PDF) on 2010-06-16.

Genes and Politics

- Fowler, J. H.; Schreiber, D (7 November 2008). "Biology, Politics, and the Emerging Science of Human Nature" (PDF). Science. 322 (5903): 912–914. Bibcode:2008Sci...322..912F. doi:10.1126/science.1158188. PMID 18988845. S2CID 206512952. Archived from the original (PDF) on 25 March 2009.
- Fowler, J. H.; Baker, Laura A.; Dawes, Christopher T. (May 2008). "Genetic Variation in Political Participation" (PDF). American Political Science Review. 102 (2): 233–248. doi:10.1017/S0003055408080209. S2CID 1984498. Archived from the original (PDF) on 2019-11-28.
- Fowler, J. H.; Dawes, Christopher T. (July 2008). "Two Genes Predict Voter Turnout" (PDF). Journal of Politics. 70 (3): 579–594. doi:10.1017/S0022381608080638. S2CID 11408064. Archived from the original (PDF) on 2019-11-28.
- Dawes, C. T.; Fowler, James H. (July 2009). "Partisanship, Voting, and the Dopamine D2 Receptor Gene" (PDF). Journal of Politics. 71 (3): 1157–1171. doi:10.1017/S002238160909094X. S2CID 203452977. Archived from the original (PDF) on 2019-11-28.

Genes and Social Networks

- Fowler, J.H.; Settle, J. E.; Christakis, N. A. (1 February 2011). "Correlated Genotypes in Friendship Networks" (PDF). Proceedings of the National Academy of Sciences. 108 (5): 1993–1997. Bibcode:2011PNAS..108.1993F. doi:10.1073/pnas.1011687108. PMC 3033315. PMID 21245293. Archived from the original (PDF) on 11 November 2011.
- Fowler, J. H.; Dawes, C. T.; Christakis, N. A. (10 February 2009). "Model of Genetic Variation in Human Social Networks". Proceedings of the National Academy of Sciences. 106 (6): 1720–1724. arXiv:0807.3089. Bibcode:2009PNAS..106.1720F. doi:10.1073/pnas.0806746106. PMC 2644104. PMID 19171900.

Experimental Studies of Cooperation and Egalitarianism

- Cesarini, D.; Dawes, C. T.; Fowler, J. H.; Johannesson, M.; Lichtenstein, P.; Wallace, B. (11 March 2008). "Heritability of Cooperative Behavior in the Trust Game". Proceedings of the National Academy of Sciences. 105 (10): 3721–3726. Bibcode:2008PNAS..105.3721C. doi:10.1073/pnas.0710069105. PMC 2268795. PMID 18316737.
- Dawes, C. T.; Fowler, JH; Johnson, T; McElreath, R; Smirnov, O (12 April 2007). "Egalitarian Motives in Humans" (PDF). Nature. 446 (7137): 794–796. Bibcode:2007Natur.446..794D. doi:10.1038/nature05651. PMID 17429399. S2CID 896174. Archived from the original (PDF) on 5 July 2008.
- Fowler, J. H.; Johnson, Tim; Smirnov, Oleg (6 January 2005). "Egalitarian Motive and Altruistic Punishment" (PDF). Nature. 433 (7021): E1. Bibcode:2005Natur.433Q....F. doi:10.1038/nature03256. PMID 15637787. S2CID 4413236. Archived from the original (PDF) on 5 July 2008.
- McDermott, R.; Fowler, James H.; Smirnov, Oleg (April 2008). "On the Evolutionary Origin of Prospect Theory Preferences" (PDF). Journal of Politics. 70 (2): 335–350. doi:10.1017/S0022381608080341. S2CID 1788641. Archived from the original (PDF) on 2009-03-25.

Evolutionary Models

- Johnson, D.D.P.; Fowler, James H. (15 September 2011). "The Evolution of Overconfidence" (PDF). Nature. 477 (7364): 317–320. arXiv:0909.4043. Bibcode:2011Natur.477..317J. doi:10.1038/nature10384. PMID 21921915. S2CID 4384687. Archived from the original (PDF) on 11 November 2011.
- Fowler, J. H. (10 May 2005). "Altruistic Punishment and the Origin of Cooperation". Proceedings of the National Academy of Sciences. 102 (19): 7047–7049. Bibcode:2005PNAS..102.7047F. doi:10.1073/pnas.0500938102. PMC 1100778. PMID 15857950.
- Fowler, J. H. (22 September 2005). "Second Order Free Riding Problem Solved" (PDF). Nature. 437 (7058): E8, discussion E8–9. Bibcode:2005Natur.437E...8F. doi:10.1038/nature04201. PMID 16177738. S2CID 4425399. Archived from the original (PDF) on 11 September 2008.

Altruism and Political Participation

- Fowler, J. H. (August 2006). "Altruism and Turnout" (PDF). Journal of Politics. 68 (3): 674–683. doi:10.1111/j.1468-2508.2006.00453.x. S2CID 2978329. Archived from the original (PDF) on 2008-09-11.
- Fowler, J. H.; Kam, Cindy D. (August 2007). "Beyond the Self: Altruism, Social Identity, and Political Participation" (PDF). Journal of Politics. 69 (3): 811–825. doi:10.1111/j.1468-2508.2007.00577.x. S2CID 12533668. Archived from the original (PDF) on 2008-09-11.

Legislator Social Networks

- Fowler, J. H. (Fall 2006). "Connecting the Congress: A Study of Cosponsorship Networks" (PDF). Political Analysis. 14 (4): 456–487. doi:10.1093/pan/mpl002. Archived from the original (PDF) on 2008-09-11.
- Fowler, J. H. (October 2006). "Legislative Cosponsorship Networks in the U.S. House and Senate" (PDF). Social Networks. 28 (4): 454–465. doi:10.1016/j.socnet.2005.11.003. Archived from the original (PDF) on 2008-09-11.

Voter Social Networks

- Fowler, J. H. (2005). "Turnout in a Small World". In Zuckerman, Alan (ed.). Social Logic of Politics (PDF). Philadelphia: Temple Univ. Press. pp. 269–287. ISBN 978-1-59213-148-8. Archived from the original (PDF) on 2008-09-11.
- Fowler, J. H.; Smirnov, Oleg (January 2005). "Dynamic Parties and Social Turnout: An Agent-Based Model" (PDF). American Journal of Sociology. 110 (4): 1070–1094. doi:10.1086/426554. S2CID 12293532. Archived from the original (PDF) on 2008-09-11.

Network of Supreme Court Precedents

- Fowler, J. H.; Jeon, S (January 2008). "The Authority of Supreme Court Precedent" (PDF). Social Networks. 30 (1): 16–30. doi:10.1016/j.socnet.2007.05.001. Archived from the original (PDF) on 2008-09-11.
- Fowler, J. H.; Johnson, T. R.; Spriggs, J. F.; Jeon, S.; Wahlbeck, P. J. (July 2007). "Network Analysis and the Law: Measuring the Legal Importance of Supreme Court Precedents" (PDF). Political Analysis. 15 (3): 324–346. doi:10.1093/pan/mpm011. Archived from the original (PDF) on 2008-09-11.
