= Agni Vlavianos Arvanitis =

Greek professor and researcher in biology (1936–2018)

- Born: 9 March 1936
- Died: 7 April 2018 (aged 83)

Agni Vlavianos Arvanitis (9 March 1936 – 7 April 2018) was a professor and researcher in biology. Her main contribution lies in the field of biopolitics, and the theory of bios. She graduated from Barnard College in 1957 (B.A.), New York University (M.S.) and the University of Athens (Ph.D.). She worked as a researcher at the Museum of Natural History in New York, the University of California at Berkeley, and the University of Paris. She has also taught Biology, Biochemistry and Human Genetics at the Friends Seminary in New York, the American Community Schools Academy in Athens, and the University of Maryland.

== The biopolitics theory ==
Her theory of biopolitics sees biopolitics as a conceptual and operative framework for societal development, promoting bios (Greek = life) as the central theme in every human endeavor, be it policy, education, art, government, science or technology. This concept uses bios as a term referring to all forms of life on our planet, including their genetic and geographic variation.

== Achievements ==
In 1985, Agni Vlavianos Arvanitis founded the Biopolitics International Organisation (B.I.O.) with the goal of promoting respect for the gift of bios (life) and international cooperation for the protection of the environment. B.I.O created an international network of associates in over 160 countries around the world, with scholars and decision-makers supporting its goals and projects.

== Recognition ==
Agni Vlavianos Arvanitis was the recipient of a number of international distinctions including election as Honorary President for Life of the United Nations Association in Sri Lanka; election as an International Patron of the Global Cooperation for a Better World; the commemorative Gold Medal of Honor for outstanding achievements and dedication to personal and professional goals, as well as election as 1994 Woman of the year by ABI. Notably she has been appointed Doctor Honoris Causa of Mendeleyev University in Moscow, and Honorary professor of St. Petersburg State Technological University of Plant Polymers.
