= SWAP-200 =

- Purpose: identifies personality disorders

The Shedler-Westen Assessment Procedure (SWAP-200) is a psychological test for personality diagnosis and clinical case formulation, developed by psychologists Jonathan Shedler and Drew Westen. SWAP-200 is completed by a mental health professional based on their observations and knowledge of a patient, client, or assessment subject. The person being assessed does not interact with the test. Because SWAP-200 is completed by the clinician, it may be argued that diagnostic findings depend less upon the accuracy of information people disclose about themselves and that test results are harder to fake relative to self-assessments (though a person being assessed could still have presented their self in a particular way so as to change how they are perceived). The SWAP instruments are based on over two decades of empirical research described in more than 100 articles in peer-reviewed scientific journals. SWAP-200 has been translated into fifteen languages. Other SWAP instruments include the revised SWAP-II and the SWAP-II-A for adolescents.

SWAP-200 is used by clinical practitioners to identify core psychological issues to address in psychotherapy, for personality disorder diagnosis, by forensic examiners, and by agencies of the United States federal government for assessment of personnel for sensitive positions such as those requiring high-level security clearances.

== Scoring and interpretation ==
SWAP-200 comprises 200 personality-descriptive items or statements, each of which may describe a given person well, somewhat, or not at all. The clinician-assessor sorts or ranks the statements into eight categories, from most descriptive of the person (scored 7) to not descriptive or irrelevant (scored 0). SWAP-200 items are written in jargon-free language ("Tends to express anger in passive and indirect ways; may make mistakes, procrastinate, forget, become sulky, etc.") and provide a "standard vocabulary" for clinical case description that can be used by mental health clinicians of all theoretical orientations. The SWAP instrument is based on the Q-sort method, a psychometric method designed to maximize reliability and minimize error variance.

When the assessor completes the scoring procedure, software-based scoring algorithms compute and graph 37 diagnostic scales organized into three score profiles. The diagnostic scale scores are expressed as T-scores (Mean=50, SD=10). The score profiles provide:

- DSM-5 personality disorder diagnoses,
- personality diagnoses for alternative, empirically-derived personality syndromes
- dimensional trait scores

The National Security Edition of SWAP-200, developed in collaboration with agencies of the United States federal government, includes the Dispositional Indicators of Risk Exposure (DIRE) scale for security risk assessment, developed to assess the potential for high-risk or destructive behavior among personnel employed in, or being evaluated for, sensitive positions such as those requiring access to classified information.

When a SWAP-200 assessment is conducted in the context of psychotherapy, the instrument may be scored by the clinician after a minimum of six clinical contact hours. In research, forensic, personnel, and other assessment contexts, SWAP-200 can be scored on the basis of the Clinical Diagnostic Interview (CDI), a systematic version of the kind of interviewing skilled clinicians engage in to assess personality. The interview can be completed in approximately 2 1/2 hours. SWAP can also be scored reliably on the basis of other, comparably psychologically rich interview sources.

== Reliability and validity ==
SWAP-200 diagnostic scales show high reliability and validity. The median inter-rater reliability of SWAP diagnostic scales is above .80 and median test-retest reliability over a four to six month interval is .90. The scales show high convergent validity with a wide range of criterion variables including genetic history variables (e.g., psychosis and substance abuse in first- and second-degree biological relatives), developmental history variables (e.g., childhood physical abuse, sexual abuse, truancy, school-related problems), life events (psychiatric hospitalizations, suicide attempts, arrests, criminal violence, domestic violence), measures of occupational functioning, measures of social and interpersonal functioning, global adaptive functioning, response to mental health treatment, and other criterion measures.
