= Albert Somit =

American political scientist (1919–2020)

Albert Somit (October 25, 1919 – August 2, 2020) was an American political scientist known for his pioneering work in biopolitics. He turned 100 in October 2019 and died in August 2020.

== Biography ==
Somit was born in Chicago, Illinois in October 1919 but grew up in Council Bluffs, Iowa. He was educated at the University of Chicago, where he received his bachelor's degree in 1941 and his Ph.D. in 1947. He served as a professor at the State University of New York at Buffalo for 35 years, and as the university's executive vice president for the last 10 of them. On August 14, 1980, he became the 14th president of Southern Illinois University Carbondale (SIUC). He stepped down from his position as president in 1987, whereupon the SIUC Board of Trustees named him a Distinguished Service Professor.
