= Erika Christakis =

American educator and author

- Born: Erika Zuckerman
- Education: Harvard University (BA); Johns Hopkins University (MPH); University of Pennsylvania (MA); Lesley University (MEd)
- Subject: Early childhood education
- Notable works: The Importance of Being Little
- Spouse: Nicholas Christakis
- Children: 4

Erika Christakis (née Zuckerman) is an American educator and writer, specializing in early childhood education. She is author of The Importance of Being Little.

== Education and early career ==
Christakis graduated from Harvard College with a degree in social anthropology in 1986. She was one of the first undergraduate interns at Harvard's Foundation for Intercultural and Race Relations and studied in Kenya in 1985. In the late 1980s and early 1990s, Christakis worked on public health projects in Bangladesh and Ghana and served as a case manager for indigent adults with mental illness and addiction in Boston.

In 1990, Christakis obtained a Master of Public Health degree from Johns Hopkins University, with a concentration in international health. In 1993, she obtained a second master's degree from the Annenberg School for Communication at the University of Pennsylvania, with a focus on the role of education campaigns to prevent HIV infection and to improve maternal and child health. Christakis obtained her third master's degree in 2008, in early childhood education, from Lesley University and was then licensed in Massachusetts as an early childhood teacher and preschool director.

== Career ==
Since the 1990s, Christakis has worked as a preschool teacher, college administrator and instructor, educational consultant, and writer and journalist.

From 2009 to 2013, Christakis was appointed Co-Master, together with her husband, the scientist Nicholas Christakis, of Pforzheimer House at Harvard College.

In 2013, Christakis moved to Yale University, where she was appointed Lecturer in Early Childhood Education at the Zigler Center in Child Development and Social Policy at the Yale Child Study Center. At Yale, she has taught undergraduate courses in child policy, early childhood education, and child development. She was appointed Associate Master of Silliman College, one of Yale's 12 residential colleges, in the spring of 2015, a post she held until June 2016.

Christakis has written on the developmental needs of children, young adults, and families, and on popular culture and other topics, for many venues, including The Atlantic, CNN.com, The Washington Post, The Huffington Post, the Financial Times, and The Boston Globe. She wrote a Time Ideas column for two years. She has written in the defense of the rights of minors and criticized the increasing bureaucratization of American schooling. Her article in The Atlantic in early 2016, "The New Preschool Is Crushing Kids", was described in Slate as having an "explosive" effect on the education world.

Her book, The Importance of Being Little: What Preschoolers Really Need From Grownups was published by Viking Penguin in February 2016, and it debuted on the New York Times Hardcover Nonfiction Bestseller List of February 28, 2016, at number 19. Science described the book as "superbly written" and "supported by a rich scientific literature". The book also inspired a string quartet by composer Travis Ramsey.

In October 2019, she joined the National Advisory Board of Defending the Early Years, a non-profit organization working for just, equitable, and quality early childhood education.

Christakis has spoken twice at the Aspen Institute Ideas Festival.

=== Support for Free Expression ===
During her time as a Co-Master of Pforzheimer House at Harvard in 2012, Christakis was involved in the defense of free expression. She came to the defense of minority students who were using satire to criticize the final clubs at that institution, arguing that policing free expression on campus "denies students the opportunity to learn to think for themselves." In another column that same year, she came to the defense of a high school student wearing a T-shirt supporting gay rights.

In October 2015, in her capacity as Associate Master of Silliman College at Yale, Christakis wrote an email to Silliman students regarding the role of free expression in universities. Her note was in response to a directive from the Yale Intercultural Affairs Committee that provided guidelines regarding Halloween costumes for all undergraduates. Christakis argued that, from a developmental perspective, students might wish to consider whether administrators should provide such guidance to college-age students. This claim engendered mixed reactions on campus, but The Atlantic noted that "her message was a model of relevant, thoughtful, civil engagement." At the end of the academic year (in June 2016), Christakis decided no longer to teach at Yale, and, on the anniversary of the events (in October 2016), she described the difficult circumstances she had faced, expressing concern that a "culture of protection may ultimately harm those it purports to protect." By 2023, the 2015 events had come to be seen, in retrospect, as indicators of a concerning sea change in attitudes on American university campuses. The events also motivated, in part, the release of a report by the Yale Committee on Trust in Higher Education in 2026.

In 2023, Christakis received the Silverglate Award for Championing Free Expression from the Foundation for Individual Rights and Expression.

== Personal ==
Christakis is married to scientist and author Nicholas Christakis and they have four children, one of whom they adopted later in life, while serving as foster parents.
