= Drew Westen =

American psychologist and political writer and messaging consultant

- Education: Harvard University; University of Sussex; University of Michigan
- Known for: Confirmation bias in politics, SWAP-200
- Scientific career
- Fields: Psychology
- Workplaces: Emory University, Harvard Medical School, University of Michigan, Boston University

Drew Westen is a professor in the Departments of Psychology and Psychiatry at Emory University in Atlanta, Georgia; the founder of Westen Strategies, LLC, a strategic messaging consulting firm that serves nonprofits and political organizations. Additionally, Westen is a writer. He is also the co-founder, alongside Joel Weinberger, of Implicit Strategies, a market research firm that measures consumers' unconscious responses to advertising and brands.

== Early life and education ==
He grew up in North Carolina and Georgia and received a Bachelor of Arts from Harvard University, a Master of Arts in Social and Political Thought from the University of Sussex (England), and a Doctor of Philosophy in clinical psychology from the University of Michigan, where he taught introductory psychology from 1985 to 1991.

== Career ==
Westen is a strategic messaging consultant for nonprofit organizations and has been a consultant or advisor to progressive and Democratic organizations, including the House and Senate Democratic Caucuses. In addition, Westen is a commentator on television, radio, in print, and online, and has been a frequent contributor to the opinion pages of The New York Times, The Washington Post, The Los Angeles Times, CNN.com, and The Huffington Post. His 2011 article on Obama's leadership in the Sunday New York Times was one of the most widely read pieces in the history of the Sunday Times and drew considerable attention, including from the White House. The President and his close advisors were so incensed and concerned about its impact, as it captured popular opinion at the time about his leadership style, that they sent out a thirty-plus-page email of talking points to friendly journalists to use when he was interviewed on television and radio.

=== Research ===
His academic research spans many areas, most of it focused on the assessment, classification, and diagnosis of mental disorders in adults and adolescents, with a particular focus on personality disorders, although he has also done research on eating disorders, unconscious processes, mood disorders, the psychological processes underlying the capacity or incapacity to maintain intimate relationships, attachment, psychological anthropology, social and affective neuroscience, and a number of other topics. He has made numerous contributions to the literature in psychoanalysis, attempting to integrate it with empirical psychology, psychiatry, and neuroscience. He has expressed concern, however, that psychoanalysts should not only be able to diagnose psychological dynamics but also to be able to make traditional diagnoses, which often have treatment implications that a single-minded focus on psychoanalytic case formulation should not, but often does, obscure their vision. After several years at the University of Michigan, he then moved to Harvard University, where he was associate professor in the Department of Psychiatry and Chief Psychologist at the Cambridge Hospital.

At Harvard University and at Emory, Westen's work has focused on alternative ways of assessing and classifying personality disorders and developing and refining the Shedler-Westen Assessment Procedure as a tool for researchers and clinicians to help further the understanding of personality and its disorders. He is unusual among academic clinical psychologists in being both an active researcher and a practicing clinician for 20 years, who has written on what can be learned from both science and practice. This is reflected in over a decade's work on how to revise the diagnostic manual in psychiatry so that it is useful both to clinicians and researchers.

Much of Westen's theoretical work has attempted to bridge perspectives, particularly cognitive, psychodynamic, and evolutionary. He has published over 200 research papers in the scientific literature.

=== Political bias study ===
In January 2006 a group of scientists led by Westen announced at the annual Society for Personality and Social Psychology conference in Palm Springs, California the results of a study in which functional magnetic resonance imaging (fMRI) showed that self-described Democrats and Republicans responded to negative remarks about their political candidate of choice in systematically biased ways.

Specifically, when Republican test subjects were shown self-contradictory quotes by George W. Bush and when Democratic test subjects were shown self-contradictory quotes by John Kerry, both groups tended to explain away the apparent contradictions in a manner biased to favor their candidate of choice. Similarly, areas of the brain responsible for reasoning (notably the dorsolateral prefrontal cortex) did not respond during the time subjects were coming to these conclusions, whereas circuits involved in processing negative emotion (e.g., the insular gyrus), conflict monitoring and resolution (the anterior cingulate), and what the researchers presumed to be unconscious emotion regulation (neural activity in the ventromedial and orbital prefrontal cortex) showed increased activity as compared to the subjects’ responses to politically neutral statements associated with politically neutral people (such as Tom Hanks).

Subjects were then presented with information that exonerated their candidate of choice. When this occurred, areas of the brain involved in reward (notably dopamine-rich regions such as the striatum / nucleus accumbens) showed increased activity, essentially reinforcing both their positive feelings toward their favored candidate and defensive reasoning.

Westen said,

None of the circuits involved in conscious reasoning were particularly engaged... Essentially, it appears as if partisans twirl the cognitive kaleidoscope until they get the conclusions they want... Everyone... may reason to emotionally biased judgments when they have a vested interest in how to interpret 'the facts.'

The study was published in the Journal of Cognitive Neuroscience 18:11, pp. 1947–58, a peer-reviewed scientific journal.

=== Books ===
In 2007, PublicAffairs published Westen's The Political Brain. The book has been widely used by political candidates and leaders around the world and is credited as having influenced campaign strategies in a number of races, beginning with the 2008 Presidential race. President Bill Clinton described it as one of the most significant books in politics he had read in a decade.

== Personal life ==
He is divorced and has two children.
