= Lise Vesterlund =

Behavioral economist

- Education: University of Copenhagen; University of Wisconsin–Madison
- Occupations: Behavioral and experimental economist

Lise Vesterlund is a behavioral and experimental economist, and the Andrew W. Mellon Professor of Economics at the University of Pittsburgh. She is a research associate at the National Bureau of Economic Research. From 1997 to 2001, she was assistant professor at the Iowa State University. She is on the board of editors of the American Economic Journal: Economic Policy and of the Experimental Economics journal. Since 2018, she is a visiting professor at the Norwegian School of Economics.

== Education ==
Vesterlund earned a B.A. in economics from the University of Copenhagen in 1990, and a Ph.D. in economics from the University of Wisconsin–Madison in 1997.

== Research ==
Her research mainly focuses on charitable giving and gender differences in the labor market. She has published in leading journals such as the Quarterly Journal of Economics and the American Economic Review and her work has been quoted over 10000 times. In her most quoted paper (with Muriel Niederle), "Do Women Shy Away From Competition? Do Men Compete Too Much?", they examine in a laboratory environment how men and women react differently to competition. They find that men prefer competition as they tend to be overconfident. Her research has been featured in news outlets including the New York Times, the Washington Post, The Atlantic, Bloomberg, Time magazine, and CNBC.

== Selected works ==
- Andreoni, James; Harbaugh, William; Vesterlund, Lise (2003/06). "The Carrot or the Stick: Rewards, Punishments, and Cooperation". American Economic Review. 93 (3): 893–902.
- Andreoni, James; Vesterlund, Lise (2001-02-01). "Which is the Fair Sex? Gender Differences in Altruism". The Quarterly Journal of Economics. 116 (1): 293–312.
- Niederle, Muriel; Vesterlund, Lise (2007-08-01). "Do Women Shy Away From Competition? Do Men Compete Too Much?". The Quarterly Journal of Economics. 122 (3): 1067–1101.
