= Muriel Niederle =

Austrian-American economist

Academic background
- Education: Harvard University (PhD)
- Doctoral advisor: Drew Fudenberg; David Laibson; Alvin Roth

Academic work
- Institutions: Stanford University
- Awards: Fellow of the Econometric Society (2017); American Academy of Arts and Sciences (2024)
- Website: web.stanford.edu/~niederle/

Muriel Niederle (born c. 1970) is a professor in the Department of Economics at Stanford University. Niederle teaches courses at Stanford University focusing specifically on experimental economics and market design. Muriel Niederle is interested in studying behavioral and experimental economics. Niederle's most recent publication was "Probabilistic States versus Multiple Certainties: The Obstacle of Uncertainty in Contingent Reasoning" in November 2017. She was elected a Fellow of the Econometric Society in 2017. She was elected to the American Academy of Arts and Sciences in 2024.

== Career ==
Niederle earned her doctorate in economics at Harvard University in 2002 and after graduating became an assistant professor of economics at Stanford University, where she was promoted to associate professor with tenure in 2007 and full professor in 2012. Niederle is an NBER Research Associate and the organizer of the annual SITE conference on Experimental Economics at Stanford.

Niederle maintains a blog on behavioral and experimental economics, and gender. Furthermore, since 2010 she is an associate editor of the American Economic Journal- Microeconomics, and since 2009 she is associate editor of the Journal of European Economic Association and associate editor of Quantitative Economics. Moreover, Niederle shared her experiences as a mentor at the CeMent CSWEP Mentoring Workshop on January 5–7, 2014 in Philadelphia.

== Research ==
Some of Niederle's most-cited work examines gender competitive norms, such as in "Do women shy away from competition? Do men compete too much?" (2007) with Lise Vesterlund, and "Performance in competitive environments: Gender differences" (2003) with Uri Gneezy and Aldo Rustichini.

== Awards ==
- Economics Distinguished Faculty Advising Award, Stanford, 2015.
- Fellow of the Econometric Society (2017).
- Alfred P. Sloan Research Fellowship, 2006–2008.
- Eligible Fellow for the Center for Advanced Study in the Behavioral Sciences.
- Visiting member, Institute for Advanced Study, School of Social Science, Princeton, 2005–2006.
