= Nicholas Christakis =

American physician and sociologist (born 1962)

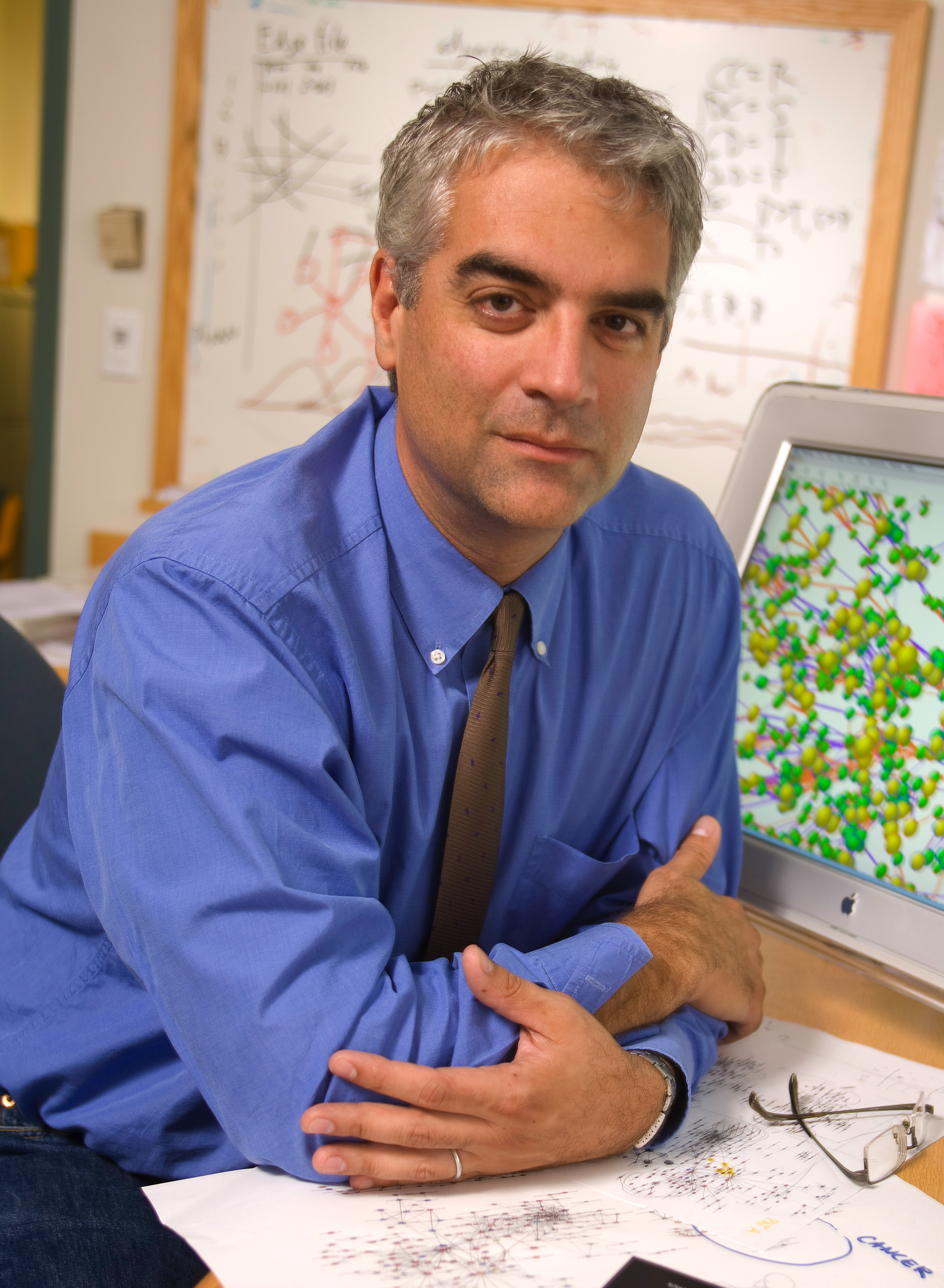
- Christakis in 2011
- Born: May 7, 1962 (age 64); New Haven, Connecticut, U.S.
- Education: Yale University (BS); Harvard University (MD, MPH); University of Pennsylvania (PhD)
- Spouse: Erika Christakis
- Scientific career
- Fields: Sociology; sociobiology
- Workplaces: University of Pennsylvania; University of Chicago; Harvard University; Yale University
- Doctoral advisor: Renée Fox
- Website: nicholaschristakis.net

Nicholas A. Christakis (US: /ˌnɪkələs krɪˌstɑːkɪs/ NIK-ə-liss kriss-TAK-iss) (born May 7, 1962) is an American and Greek sociologist and physician known for his research on social networks and on the social, economic, biological, and evolutionary determinants of human welfare (including the behavior, health, and capabilities of individuals and groups). He is the Sterling Professor of Social and Natural Science at Yale University, where he directs the Human Nature Lab. He is also the codirector of the Yale Institute for Network Science.

Christakis was elected a Fellow of the National Academy of Sciences in 2024. He was elected a Fellow of the National Academy of Medicine in 2006; of the American Association for the Advancement of Science in 2010; and of the American Academy of Arts and Sciences in 2017. In 2021, he received an honorary degree in economics from the University of Athens, Greece. He was awarded the Barry Prize for Distinguished Intellectual Achievement by the American Academy of Sciences and Letters in 2024.

In 2009, Christakis was named to the Time 100, Time magazine's list of the 100 most influential people in the world. In 2009 and again in 2010, he was named by Foreign Policy magazine to its list of top global thinkers.

== Early life and education ==
Christakis' parents are Greek. They had three biological children and adopted a Black girl and a Taiwanese boy. His father was a nuclear physicist turned business consultant and his mother a physical chemist turned psychologist.

Christakis was born in New Haven, Connecticut in 1962 when both his parents were Yale University graduate students. His family returned to Greece when he was three, and Greek became his first language. He returned to the United States with his family at age six and grew up in Washington, D.C. He graduated from St. Albans School.

Christakis obtained a B.S. in biology from Yale University in 1984, where he won the Russell Henry Chittenden Prize. He received an M.D. from Harvard Medical School and an M.P.H. from the Harvard School of Public Health in 1989, winning the Bowdoin Prize.

In 1991, Christakis completed a residency in Internal Medicine at the University of Pennsylvania Health System. He was certified by the American Board of Internal Medicine in 1993. He obtained a Ph.D. in sociology from the University of Pennsylvania in 1995. While at the University of Pennsylvania as a Robert Wood Johnson Clinical Scholar, he studied with Renee C. Fox, a distinguished American medical sociologist; other members of his dissertation committee were methodologist Paul Allison and physician Sankey Williams. His dissertation was published as Death Foretold, his first book.

== Career ==
In 1995, Christakis started as an assistant professor with joint appointments in the Departments of Sociology and of Medicine at the University of Chicago. In 2001, he was awarded tenure in both Sociology and Medicine. He left the University of Chicago to take up a position at Harvard in 2001. Until July 2013, he was a professor of sociology in the Department of Sociology in the Harvard Faculty of Arts and Sciences; a professor of medical sociology in the Department of Health Care Policy and a professor of medicine in the Department of Medicine at Harvard Medical School; and an attending physician at the Harvard-affiliated Mount Auburn Hospital.

In 2013, Christakis moved to Yale University, where he is a professor of social and natural science in the Department of Sociology, with additional appointments in the Departments of Statistics and Data Science; Ecology and Evolutionary Biology; Biomedical Engineering; Medicine; and in the School of Management. He served as the Sol Goldman Family Professor of Social and Natural Science from 2013 to 2018, when he was appointed as a Sterling Professor, the highest honor bestowed on Yale faculty.

From 2009 to 2013, Christakis and his wife, Erika Christakis, were Co-Masters of Pforzheimer House, one of Harvard's twelve residential houses. From 2015 to 2016, he served in a similar capacity at Silliman College at Yale University.

=== Research ===
Christakis uses quantitative methods (e.g., experiments, mathematical models, and statistical analyses). His work focuses on network science and biosocial science, and it has also involved sociology, economics, demography, evolutionary biology, evolutionary psychology, behavior genetics, and epidemiology. He is an author or editor of six books, more than 200 peer-reviewed academic articles, numerous editorials in national and international publications, and at least three patents. His laboratory is also active in the development and release of software to conduct large-scale social science experiments, pioneering its use beginning in 2009 (e.g., Breadboard, Trellis).

Christakis' early work was on physician decision-making and end-of-life care. He first began to study interpersonal social network effects in this setting in the late 1990s, with a series of studies of the widowhood effect, whereby the death of one person might increase the risk of death of their spouse. He developed a number of innovative ways to estimate the causal nature of these effects (e.g., by studying how the death of a man's ex-wife might affect his risk of death), and he expanded the scope of such work to analyze, for instance, how the precise diagnosis or duration of illness of the decedent might modify the risk of death of their survivor or how better quality of health care given to a dying person might reduce the risk of death of their survivor. In a 2006 paper in The New England Journal of Medicine that analyzed 518,240 elderly couples, he explored how hospitalization of a spouse, and not just their death, might affect a survivor's mortality risk.

Building on his early studies of network effects involving simple dyads of people (spousal pairs), Christakis began to examine the impact of illness and death through social networks of family, friends, and colleagues. Starting in 2004, he began to study "hyper-dyadic" network effects, whereby processes of social contagion moved beyond pairs of people. Using observational studies with his colleague James H. Fowler, he documented that a variety of phenomena like obesity, smoking, and happiness, rather than being solely individualistic, also arise via social contagion mechanisms over some distance within complex social networks (see: "three degrees of influence"). Later observational work explored how vaccination might spread across social networks. In a 2010 TED talk, Christakis summarized the broader implications of the role of networks in human activity.

In 2010, by exploiting the friendship paradox, a paper analyzed the spread of H1N1 influenza at Harvard University (as part of the 2009 swine flu pandemic) and showed that an understanding of social networks could be used to develop 'sensors' for forecasting epidemics (of germs and other phenomena). In another 2010 TED talk, Christakis describes this effort (and computational social science more generally). A follow-up paper in 2014 documented the utility of this "friendship paradox" "sensor networks" approach to forecast online trends using Twitter data.

Beginning in 2010, further work by Christakis and his collaborators used experimental methods and diverse data sets and settings to study social network contagion and structure, thereby enhancing the robustness of causal inference. For instance, a 2010 paper demonstrated that cooperative behavior could spread to three degrees of separation. A 2015 paper showed that vitamin use in developing-world villages could be made to be contagious. A 2022 paper used another experiment to show how a novel "pair targeting" algorithm could enhance population-level social contagion of the adoption of iron-fortified salt to reduce anemia in mothers and children in India. A randomized controlled field trial involving 24,702 people in 176 villages in Honduras published in 2024 documented social contagion in diverse health behaviors to two degrees of separation.

Christakis and colleagues also published a series of papers exploring how experimental manipulation of social network structure itself might enhance human welfare. Early work, starting in 2011, focused on how experimental manipulation of network structure could enhance human cooperation and economic productivity. Other work explored how network topology could affect human communication during a time of crisis or could optimize resource sharing. A 2019 paper in PNAS showed that experimentally re-wiring social networks could enhance human welfare without either redistributing or increasing resources. In 2026, the group published the results of a large randomized field trial in 110 villages in Honduras in Nature, showing that an educational intervention, serving as a kind of exogenous social institution, could rewire social connections among villagers.

Related to the topic of the role of network structure, an observational study of a novel monetary system (Sardex, a complementary currency introduced in Sardinia in response to the 2008 financial crisis) showed that k-cycle centrality was associated with economic success at the level of individual firms or the system as a whole.

In 2009, Christakis' group began to study the evolutionary biology, genetics, and physiology of social networks, publishing in PNAS a finding that social network position may be partially heritable, and specifically that an increase in twins' shared genetic material corresponds to differences in their social networks. In 2011, a follow-up paper on "Correlated Genotypes in Friendship Networks" in PNAS advanced the argument that humans may be metagenomic with respect to the people around them. Further work on this topic included "Friendship and Natural Selection" in PNAS in 2014, showing that people have a small but discernible preference for choosing as their friends other people who resemble them roughly as much as third or fourth cousins. In 2012, in a paper in Nature, Christakis' group analyzed the social networks of the Hadza hunter-gatherers, showing that human social network structure appears to have ancient origins. Anthropologist Joseph Henrich noted that "the crucial insight from this work is that understanding distinct aspects of cooperation among these hunter-gatherers must incorporate an analysis of the dynamic processes at the population level." Christakis and his colleagues did similar work mapping the networks of the Nyangatom people of Sudan in 2016. His group has also demonstrated that social networks are deeply related to human cooperation. These ideas are explored in Christakis' 2019 book, Blueprint: The Evolutionary Origins of a Good Society.

Work on the physiology of social networks, in particular with respect to the microbiome, started to appear in 2024, in Nature. Computational biologist Nicola Segata observed that understanding the spread of the microbiome through the social network is "changing completely the way we think", because such spread suggests that conditions with links to the microbiome (such as hypertension, depression, and obesity) could spread from person to person due to biological contagion.

Beginning in 2010, Christakis' lab initiated a program of research to deploy social networks to improve welfare, health, and diverse other social phenomena—for example, facilitating the adoption of public health innovations in the developing world (e.g., India, Honduras), understanding the origins of economic inequality (published in Nature in 2015), or demonstrating the utility of autonomous agents (AI "bots") in optimizing coordination in groups (published in Nature in 2017). Economist Simon Gächter noted that "the most striking insight from these findings [in 2015] is the effect of wealth visibility on the dynamics of inequality: conspicuous inequality breeds more inequality. Although visibility of wealth does not change economic incentives in this experimental scenario, it invites social comparisons that... undermine cooperation and diminish social ties." Gachter also commented on the 2017 paper and its contributions to evolutionary game theory.

The 2017 paper on bots initiated a program of work on "hybrid systems" composed of humans and machines (endowed with AI) that reshape how humans interact not with the machines, but with each other. A 2020 paper in PNAS extended this idea by showing that physical robots could modify conversations among people interacting in groups. Another paper that year showed that simply programmed bots could re-engineer social connections among humans in networked groups in order to make them become more cooperative. A 2023 paper in PNAS showed that simple forms of AI could change humans' ethical behavior towards others (using a cyber-physical lab experiment involving remote-control robotic cars playing the game of chicken). A 2024 paper showed that a kind of simple bot could enhance the creativity of human groups. Christakis argued in 2019 that "the effects of AI on human-to-human interaction stand to be intense and far-reaching, and the advances rapid and broad. We must investigate systematically what second-order effects might emerge and discuss how to regulate them on behalf of the common good".

Christakis' lab has been supported by grants from the National Institutes of Health, the Pioneer Program of the Robert Wood Johnson Foundation, the Bill & Melinda Gates Foundation, and by other funders. In 2019, his lab received support to extend their work to studies of the human microbiota from the Nomis Foundation.

=== Medicine ===
Christakis has practiced as a home hospice physician and in consultative palliative medicine. He took care of indigent, home-bound, dying patients in the South Side of Chicago while at the University of Chicago, from 1995 to 2001. During this time, he was also active in translating research results into national policy changes with respect to end-of-life care in the USA; for instance, he testified before the US Senate Special Committee on Aging in 2000 (regarding barriers to hospice use, prognostication, and the cost-effectiveness of hospice).

Christakis has worked with terminally ill patients and their families as an attending physician on the Palliative Medicine Consult Service at Massachusetts General Hospital in Boston and at Mount Auburn Hospital. He is currently associated with the Yale School of Medicine.

== Books ==
Christakis' first book, Death Foretold: Prophecy and Prognosis in Medical Care, was published by the University of Chicago Press in 1999 (ISBN 978-0226104706), and has been translated into Japanese. The book, based on his dissertation, explored the role of prognosis in medical thought and practice, documenting and explaining how physicians are socialized to avoid making prognoses. It argues that the prognoses patients receive, even from the best-trained American doctors, are driven not only by professional norms but also by religious, moral, and even quasi-magical beliefs (such as the "self-fulfilling prophecy").

His second book, Connected: The Surprising Power of Our Social Networks and How They Shape Our Lives, was co-authored with James Fowler and published by Little, Brown Spark in 2009 (ISBN 978-0316036146). It was awarded the "Books for a Better Life" Award in 2009 and has been translated into 20 languages. Connected draws on previously published and unpublished studies and makes several new conclusions about the influence of social networks on human health and behavior. In Connected, Christakis and Fowler put forward their "three degrees of influence" rule, which theorizes that each person's social influence can stretch to roughly three degrees of separation (to the friend of a friend of a friend) before it fades out. Nobel Prize winner Maria Ressa has said Connected influenced her establishment of Rappler: "Actually part of what drove me during that time period, and this was also important in the formation and how we created Rappler, was the Framingham Heart Study here in Massachusetts. Because [Christakis and Fowler] wrote this book where they... proved that things, emotions, ideas, actions spread through three degrees of influence."

Christakis' third book, Blueprint: The Evolutionary Origins of a Good Society, was published by Little, Brown Spark in 2019 (ISBN 978-0316230032). It made The New York Times Best Seller list in its debut week. It was widely and favorably reviewed. For instance, Bill Gates described the book as "optimistic and terrific." Blueprint explores the idea that evolution has given humans a suite of beneficial capacities, including love, friendship, social networks, cooperation, and learning; humans have innate proclivities to make a good society, one that is similar worldwide. "For too long," Christakis writes, "the scientific community has been overly focused on the dark side of our biological heritage: our capacity for tribalism, violence, selfishness, and cruelty. The bright side has been denied the attention it deserves." Overall, Blueprint advances an argument about sociodicy, that is, the "vindication of society despite its failures". It proposes a list of eight attributes of societies that are innately favored due to human evolutionary history.

Christakis' fourth book, Apollo's Arrow: The Profound and Enduring Impact of Coronavirus on the Way We Live, was published by Little, Brown Spark in October 2020 (ISBN 978-0316628228). It was widely and favorably reviewed and was called "magisterial", "gripping", and "provocative". It was long-listed for the PEN America EO Wilson Literary Science Writing Award. In essence, the book argued that "plagues are not new to our species — they are just new to us." And it provided an account of the origins, course, and eventual end of the COVID-19 pandemic. Christakis' very early work on the pandemic affected hedge-fund manager Bill Ackman, who sought advice in February, 2020, and successfully predicted the market crash in the "single best trade of all time."

Christakis has also co-edited two clinical textbooks on end-of-life care: Prognosis in advanced cancer (2008) and the Oxford Textbook of Palliative Medicine (2009), both published by Oxford University Press.

== Public intellectual ==
In addition to his scientific research and books, Christakis has contributed to popular media as a public intellectual, in a range of publications and on a range of topics. He has said he is invested in "advancing the public understanding of science", and he typically writes about matters at the intersection of the social, biological, and/or computational sciences.

For instance, in addition to his book about the COVID-19 pandemic, Apollo's Arrow, released in 2020, Christakis published numerous essays helping to advance understanding of the social, economic, psychological, and epidemiological aspects of the pandemic. In The Wall Street Journal, he forecast the long course of the pandemic in 2020, outlined optimal responses, and provided a kind of post-mortem in 2024 (outlining how the pandemic would leave us with "public forgetting and private remembrance"). In The Washington Post, he wrote about the role of compassion during epidemics. In The Atlantic, he wrote about school closures, risk perception, and public health responses. In FiveThirtyEight, he showed how voting in the primary elections did not worsen the course of the pandemic. Early in the pandemic (in August 2020), he wrote an invited essay for The Economist about how intrinsic properties of SARS-CoV-2 would make the COVID-19 pandemic more challenging to fight. The magazine relied on him for subsequent assessments of the long-term impact of the pandemic. In an interview for The Atlantic, Christakis also discussed the importance of free expression in combating the COVID-19 pandemic.

For The New York Times, Christakis has written on prognostication, university education, free expression, and the evolution of social sciences. His essay on social science was said to have "created quite a stir", and it prompted debate and commentary. For The Washington Post, he has written not only about COVID but also about: mass shootings, fatherhood, the reform of American universities, the appeal of imperfection when it comes to AI (in a reflection of wabi-sabi), and teaching in Ukraine during a time of war (in 2025). For the Wall Street Journal, beyond COVID, he has written about vote rigging in Congress. For the Boston Review, with respect to inequality, he argued that recent research showed that "the luxuries of others matter if we can see them". He has also written about how to "construct novel, unnatural social systems based on the predictable ways that humans act" for The Boston Globe; the role of social artificial intelligence for The Atlantic; and about social network dynamics for the Financial Times. He published an article in The Economist in 2023 on the social and economic spillover effects of AI, arguing that AI systems will change how humans treat each other.

In 2012, he wrote a series of online columns for Time with his wife, Erika Christakis, on a range of topics from academic dishonesty to women in the armed services. For the same publication, in 2011, he wrote about biosocial science, and, in 2019, about the link between cooperation and individuality, arguing that such a perspective was useful "in a moment when too much tribalism is causing devastating problems". In 2024, he argued that poor decision-making by corporate and nonprofit boards could partly be understood based on their internal network structure.

Christakis has also appeared periodically on TV and radio, commenting on social networks and social interactions, the COVID-19 pandemic, and other matters, including on NPR, Amanpour & Company, and other venues. Krista Tippett of NPR has said his perspective on human goodness "deepens and refreshes". He has been featured in a number of documentaries about science, including Through the Wormhole, Unnatural Causes: Is Inequality Making Us Sick?, and This Emotional Life (on PBS). Interviews with Christakis have appeared in The New York Times, The Atlantic, and elsewhere. He has been a repeat guest on many leading podcasts, including Joe Rogan, Sam Harris, Michael Shermer, and Reason.

Christakis has given two mainstage TED talks, appeared at the Aspen Ideas Festival, and been a frequent contributor to the online salon of leading scientists and intellectuals Edge, including answering ten of its annual questions, from 2009 to 2019 and giving talks on how "social networks are like the eye" in 2008, on "a new kind of social science for the 21st century" in 2012, and on the science of social connections in 2013.

== Advocacy for free expression ==
Christakis has been involved in the defense of free expression for some time. At Harvard in 2012, he and his wife came to the defense of minority students who were using satire to criticize the elite final clubs at that institution. They suggested that the critics might be "more concerned with ugly words than the underlying problems" and that policing free expression on campus "denies students the opportunity to learn to think for themselves." They argued that it was important for Harvard students to have confidence and to develop the capacity and maturity to discuss contentious issues, rather than staying silent.

In April 2020, Christakis expressed concern that, in the setting of the COVID-19 pandemic, hospitals and medical schools were seeking to silence faculty and staff who were highlighting problems with the response; he stated that "clamping down on people who are speaking is a kind of idiocy of the highest order."

In July 2020, Christakis was one of the 153 signers of "A Letter on Justice and Open Debate" (also known as the "Harper's Letter") that expressed concern that "the free exchange of information and ideas, the lifeblood of a liberal society, is daily becoming more constricted".

In 2021, Christakis was asked to join the advisory council of the Foundation for Individual Rights and Expression (FIRE). In 2022, he joined the advisory council of Heterodox Academy.

In 2023, Christakis was the recipient of the Silverglate Award for Championing Free Expression at the inaugural gala held by the Foundation for Individual Rights and Expression in New York City.

=== Yale Halloween case ===
In 2015, Christakis and his wife, Erika, were involved in a case arising from advice about Halloween costumes at Yale University. In October of that year, the Intercultural Affairs Council at Yale (a group of fourteen administrators) sent an email to undergraduates that recommended students be careful when choosing Halloween outfits, suggesting they avoid various sorts of costumes incorporating potentially offensive elements and including a link to a Pinterest page with recommended and non-recommended costumes. In response, Erika (a lecturer on early childhood education at the Yale Child Study Center) wrote an email on October 29 on the role of free expression in universities. She argued, from a developmental perspective, that students might wish to consider whether administrators should provide guidance on Halloween attire or whether students would prefer to "dress themselves". She noted that her husband's advice was that "if you don't like a costume someone is wearing, look away, or tell them you are offended. Talk to each other. Free speech and the ability to tolerate offense are the hallmarks of a free and open society".

This e-mail played a role in protests on campus that received national attention in the United States. Christakis and his wife were criticized by some students for placing "the burden of confrontation, education, and maturity on the offended". Other students, however, pointed out that Erika Christakis was defending the rights to free expression of all Yale students and expressing confidence in them and in their capacity to discuss and confront such issues among themselves.

During the episode, some students "[asked President] Salovey to remove Nicholas and Erika Christakis from their positions at the helm of Silliman College", and, in a separate development, over 400 faculty members signed a letter on the broader issue of supporting "greater diversity". Ninety-one Yale faculty members signed a different letter supporting the Christakises, and this letter noted that the couple themselves distinguished support for freedom of expression from supporting the content of such expression (the Christakises had noted that they would find many of the same costumes offensive as some students would). Christakis stepped down from his role at Silliman College eight months later, at the end of the academic year, a step Conor Friedersdorf later decried, saying: "when Yale's history is written, they should be regarded as collateral damage harmed by people who abstracted away their humanity".

In a subsequent op-ed in The New York Times (his only published comment on the events), Christakis argued: "Open, extended conversations among students themselves are essential not only to the pursuit of truth but also to deep moral learning and to righteous social progress." A year later, commentators condemned how students, administrators, and faculty had behaved at Yale (and linked to substantial video footage of the events). In her only published remarks regarding what happened, published a year later, in October 2016, Erika Christakis described the circumstances (including threats) that she had faced in an Op-Ed published in The Washington Post. Alum James Kirchick and former dean of the Yale Law School Anthony T. Kronman have since criticized the university administration for abandoning or not supporting Christakis and his wife.

The incident led to some students being called members of "Generation Snowflake". In January 2016, Bill Maher expressed consternation at how the Yale students had behaved. In April 2017, an episode of The Simpsons titled "Caper Chase" satirized the events. Also in 2017, a short documentary was released about the episode, arguing that they reflected a collision between "old values" centered on reason and debate, on the one hand, and "administrative bloat" and a shift to a "consumer mentality" on the other (this documentary also noted that Christakis comes from a multi-racial family and has African-American and Chinese siblings). The New York Times published a coda regarding the episode in August 2018, upon Christakis' appointment as a Sterling Professor, Yale's highest faculty rank.

The case has been discussed in at least twenty nonfiction books. Philosopher Russell Blackford provides a very precise and comprehensive timeline. Some of these books noted the "sexism" and "irony" that, in a key episode that was part of the events (when Christakis was surrounded by 150 students in a quad for two hours), the students wished to hold Christakis responsible for his wife's email. Commentator Douglas Murray summarizes statements by students based on his review of extensive video footage released by the students themselves of the events in the quad, and he notes Christakis' emphasis on "our common humanity". Many of these books have expressed concern at the "illiberal" actions of the students (and of many administrators and faculty) at Yale. The behavior of the students also sparked a minor controversy at Harvard Law School when a student there wrote a piece decrying the Christakis' treatment as "fascism" in the Harvard Law Record; criticized for publishing the piece, the Record's liberal editor-in-chief wrote that his role was "editor-in-chief, not thought-policeman-in-chief." The case has also influenced fictional portrayals of such events.

A 2023 article in The Chronicle of Higher Education argued that the event signaled a worrisome sea change in attitudes on American university campuses, one "which in retrospect appears a compact fable containing all or almost all of the elements of our disorienting campus present". A "free speech summit" organized by PEN America at Harvard University in 2024 also treated the event as a pivotal one, reflecting a "fundamental shift in campus climate". The event also motivated, in part, the release of a report by the Yale Committee on Trust in Higher Education in 2026.

Christakis has spoken publicly about the events only rarely. In an October 2017 interview with Sam Harris, he discussed parts of the situation he faced, framing the events at Yale in the broader context of what was happening on many campuses during that time period; Harris noted that Christakis had "the imperturbability of a saint." In March 2019, Christakis told Frank Bruni that, partly in response to the events, he worked to complete a long-standing book project on the origins of goodness in society (Blueprint).

== Personal life ==
Christakis resides in Norwich, Vermont. He is married to early childhood educator and author Erika Christakis and they have four children, one of whom they adopted later in life, while serving as foster parents. His hobbies have included Shotokan karate (as noted by his instructor, Kazumi Tabata) and making maple syrup.

== Published works ==
=== Books ===
- Death Foretold: Prophecy and Prognosis in Medical Care (1999) ISBN 978-0226104706
- Connected: The Surprising Power of Our Social Networks and How They Shape Our Lives (2009) - with James Fowler ISBN 978-0316036146
- Blueprint: The Evolutionary Origins of a Good Society (2019) ISBN 978-0316230032
- Apollo's Arrow: The Profound and Enduring Impact of Coronavirus on the Way We Live (2020) ISBN 978-0316628228

=== Selected scientific papers ===
- Christakis, NA; Allison, PD (2006). "Mortality after the Hospitalization of a Spouse" (PDF). New England Journal of Medicine. 354 (7): 719–730. doi:10.1056/NEJMsa050196. PMID 16481639. S2CID 8229736. Archived from the original (PDF) on August 10, 2017.
- Christakis, NA; Fowler, JH (2007). "The Spread of Obesity in a Large Social Network Over 32 Years" (PDF). New England Journal of Medicine. 357 (4): 370–379. doi:10.1056/NEJMsa066082. PMID 17652652. S2CID 264194973. Archived from the original (PDF) on November 18, 2015.
- Elwert, F; Christakis, NA (2008). "The Effect of Widowhood on Mortality by the Causes of Death of Both Spouses" (PDF). American Journal of Public Health. 98 (11): 2092–2098. doi:10.2105/AJPH.2007.114348. PMC 2636447. PMID 18511733. Archived from the original (PDF) on March 4, 2016.
- Christakis, NA; Fowler, JH (2008). "Quitting in Droves: Collective Dynamics of Smoking Behavior in a Large Social Network" (PDF). New England Journal of Medicine. 358 (21): 2249–2258. doi:10.1056/NEJMsa0706154. PMC 2822344. PMID 18499567. Archived from the original (PDF) on August 10, 2017.
- Fowler, JH; Christakis, NA (2009). "The Dynamic Spread of Happiness in a Large Social Network" (PDF). British Medical Journal. 337 (768) a2338. doi:10.1136/bmj.a2338. PMC 2600606. PMID 19056788. Archived from the original (PDF) on November 18, 2015.
- Fowler, JH; Dawes, CT; Christakis, NA (2009). "Model of genetic variation in human social networks". Proceedings of the National Academy of Sciences. 106 (6): 1720–1724. Bibcode:2009PNAS..106.1720F. doi:10.1073/pnas.0806746106. PMC 2644104. PMID 19171900.
- Fowler, JH; Christakis, NA (2010). "Cooperative Behavior Cascades in Human Social Networks". Proceedings of the National Academy of Sciences. 107 (12): 5334–8. arXiv:0908.3497. Bibcode:2010PNAS..107.5334F. doi:10.1073/pnas.0913149107. PMC 2851803. PMID 20212120.
- Christakis, NA; Fowler, JH (2010). "Social Network Sensors for Early Detection of Contagious Outbreaks". PLOS ONE. 5 (9) e12948. arXiv:1004.4792. Bibcode:2010PLoSO...512948C. doi:10.1371/journal.pone.0012948. PMC 2939797. PMID 20856792.
- Christakis, NA; Fowler, JH; Imbens, GW; Kalyanaraman, K (2010). "An Empirical Model for Strategic Network Formation". NBER Working Papers. Working Paper Series (16039). doi:10.3386/w16039.
- Fowler, JH; Settle, JE; Christakis, NA (2011). "Correlated Genotypes in Friendship Networks". Proceedings of the National Academy of Sciences. 108 (5): 1993–7. Bibcode:2011PNAS..108.1993F. doi:10.1073/pnas.1011687108. PMC 3033315. PMID 21245293.
- Rand, DG; Arbesman, S; Christakis, NA (2011). "Dynamic Social Networks Promote Cooperation in Experiments with Humans". Proceedings of the National Academy of Sciences. 108 (48): 19193–8. Bibcode:2011PNAS..10819193R. doi:10.1073/pnas.1108243108. PMC 3228461. PMID 22084103.
- Apicella, CL; Marlowe, FW; Fowler, JH; Christakis, NA (2012). "Social Networks and Cooperation in Hunter-Gatherers" (PDF). Nature. 481 (7382): 497–501. Bibcode:2012Natur.481..497A. doi:10.1038/nature10736. PMC 3340565. PMID 22281599. Archived from the original (PDF) on December 15, 2017.
- Christakis, NA; Fowler, JH (2014). "Friendship and Natural Selection". Proceedings of the National Academy of Sciences. 111 (3): 10796–10801. arXiv:1308.5257. Bibcode:2014PNAS..111S0796C. doi:10.1073/pnas.1400825111. PMC 4113922. PMID 25024208.
- Nishi, CL; Shirado, FW; Rand, DG; Christakis, NA (2015). "Inequality and Visibility of Wealth in Experimental Social Networks". Nature. 526 (7382): 426–429. Bibcode:2015Natur.526..426N. doi:10.1038/nature15392. PMID 26352469. S2CID 4446774.
- Kim, DA; Hwong, AR; Stafford, D; Hughes, DA; O'Malley, AJ; Fowler, JH; Christakis, NA (2015). "Social Network Targeting to Maximize Population Behavior Change: A Cluster Randomised Controlled Trial". The Lancet. 386 (9989): 145–153. doi:10.1016/s0140-6736(15)60095-2. PMC 4638320. PMID 25952354.
- Shirado, H; Christakis, NA (2017). "Locally Noisy Autonomous Agents Improve Global Human Coordination in Network Experiments". Nature. 545 (7654): 370–374. Bibcode:2017Natur.545..370S. doi:10.1038/nature22332. PMC 5912653. PMID 28516927.
- Traeger, ML; Sebo, SS; Jung, M; Scassellati, B; Christakis, NA (2020). "Vulnerable Robots Shape Human Conversational Dynamics in a Human-Robot Team". Proceedings of the National Academy of Sciences. 117 (12): 6370–6375. Bibcode:2020PNAS..117.6370T. doi:10.1073/pnas.1910402117. PMC 7104178. PMID 32152118.
- Jia, JS; Lu, X; Yuan, Y; Xu, G; Jia, J; Christakis, NA (2020). "Population Flow Drives Spatio-Temporal Distribution of COVID-19 in China". Nature. 582 (7812): 389–394. Bibcode:2020Natur.582..389J. doi:10.1038/s41586-020-2284-y. PMID 32349120.
- Shirado, H; Christakis, NA (2020). "Network Engineering Using Autonomous Agents Increases Cooperation in Human Groups". iScience. 23 (9) 101438. Bibcode:2020iSci...23j1438S. doi:10.1016/j.isci.2020.101438. PMC 7452167. PMID 32823053.
- Alexander, M; Forastiere, L; Gupta, S; Christakis, NA. (2022). "Algorithms for seeding social networks can enhance the adoption of a public health intervention in urban India". Proceedings of the National Academy of Sciences. 119 (30): e2120742119. doi:10.1073/pnas.2120742119. PMC 9335263. PMID 35862454.
- Shirado, H; Kasahara, S; Christakis, NA. (2023). "Emergence and Collapse of Reciprocity in Semi-Automatic Driving Coordination Experiments With Humans". Proceedings of the National Academy of Sciences. 120 (51): e2307804120. doi:10.1073/pnas.2307804120.
- Airoldi, EM; Christakis, NA. (2024). "Induction of Social Contagion for Diverse Outcomes in Structured Experiments in Isolated Villages". Science 384: eadi5147. doi:10.1126/science.adi5147.
- Beghini F; Pullman J; Alexander M; Shridhar SV; Prinster D; Singh A; Juarez RM; Airolid, EM; Brito IL; and Christakis, NA. (2024). "Gut Microbiome Strain-Sharing Within Isolated Village Social Networks". Nature doi: 10.1038/s41586-024-08222-1.
- Papamichalis, M; Forastiere, L; Airoldi, EM; Christakis, NA. (2026). "Educational Intervention Can Rewire Village Social Networks". Nature doi: doi.org/10.1038/s41586-026-11154-7.
