= Biopolitics =

Premise that life is central to politics

Biopolitics is a major paradigm in the social sciences and humanities, which begins from the premise that life is central to modern politics. In the early nineteenth century, biopolitics emerged as a specific form of politics with a series of concerns over "life", such as concerns with overpopulation, public hygiene, pseudo-scientific theories such as biological racism, and into state forms of biological domination such as Nazi Germany. More recently, contemporary issues such as combating climate change, preventing the global spread of infectious diseases and pandemics, as well as rethinking the meaning of being human given biomedical advances in such areas as genetic engineering, reproductive technologies, even prosthetics, have pushed life to the forefront of politics.

Biopolitics as a concept was developed by the French philosopher Michel Foucault. Across a number of writings and lectures in the 1970s, Foucault examined how life was gradually caught up in a number of apparatuses (dispositifs) of power/knowledge, which sought to govern life. Life was managed, regulated, controlled, and in privileged cases protected. Foucault's thesis claims that contemporary power structures are increasingly preoccupied with the administration of life itself, rather than solely focusing on individual behaviors or actions. Accordingly, biopolitics entails the governance of populations as biological entities, with an emphasis on optimizing their health, productivity, and reproductive capacities in manners conducive to broader political and economic objectives. In its essence, biopolitics investigates how political power intersects with biological life, shaping the bodies, behaviors, and well-being of populations through diverse strategies and controls.

This interdisciplinary field scrutinizes the mechanisms through which political authorities and institutions exercise control over populations which goes beyond conventional forms of governance. This encompasses areas such as the regulation of health, reproduction, sexuality, and other aspects of biological existence. The governmental power of biopolitics is exerted through practices such as surveillance, healthcare policies, population control measures, gender-based laws, and the implementation of biometric identification systems.

== Background ==
Previous notions of the concept can be traced back to the Middle Ages in John of Salisbury's work Policraticus, in which the term body politic was coined and used. The term biopolitics was first used by Rudolf Kjellén, a political scientist who also coined the term geopolitics, in his 1905 two-volume work The Great Powers. Kjellén used the term in the context of his aim to study "the civil war between social groups" (comprising the state) from a biological perspective, and thus named his putative discipline "biopolitics". In Kjellén's organicist view, the state was a quasi-biological organism, a "super-individual creature". The Nazis also subsequently used the term in the context of their racial policy, with Hans Reiter using it in a 1934 speech to refer to their concept of nation and state based on racial supremacy.

In contemporary US political science studies, usage of the term is mostly divided between a poststructuralist group using the meaning assigned by Foucault (denoting social and political power over life) and another group that uses it to denote studies relating biology and political science. In the work of Foucault, biopolitics refers to the style of government that regulates populations through "biopower" (the application and impact of political power on all aspects of human life).

Morley Roberts, in his 1938 book Bio-politics argued that a correct model for world politics is "a loose association of cell and protozoa colonies". Robert E. Kuttner used the term to refer to his particular brand of "scientific racism", as he called it, which he worked out with noted antisemite Eustace Mullins, with whom Kuttner co-founded the Institute for Biopolitics in the late 1950s, and also with Glayde Whitney, a behavioral geneticist. Most of his opponents label his model as antisemitic. Kuttner and Mullins were inspired by Morley Roberts, who was in turn inspired by Arthur Keith, or both were inspired by each other and either co-wrote together (or with the Institute of Biopolitics) Biopolitics of Organic Materialism dedicated to Roberts and reprinted some of his works.

In the work of Michael Hardt and Antonio Negri, biopolitics is framed in terms of anti-capitalist insurrection using life and the body as weapons; examples include flight from power and, "in its most tragic and revolting form", suicide terrorism, conceptualized as the opposite of biopower, which is seen as the practice of sovereignty in biopolitical conditions.

According to Agni Vlavianos Arvanitis, biopolitics is a conceptual and operative framework for societal development, promoting bios (Greek for "life") as the central theme in every human endeavor, be it policy, education, art, government, science or technology. This concept uses bios as a term referring to all forms of life on our planet, including their genetic and geographic variation.

== Michel Foucault ==
In the last chapter of The History of Sexuality, "Right of Death and Power over Life", Michel Foucault argues that biopolitics is the study of how the "biological" is captured by the "political" when life enters into "knowledge's field of control and power's sphere of intervention." He points out that a new form of power emerged, which no longer is based on sovereign-juridical power (the right to "take life and let live"), instead biopower is the power to "make live and let die". In place of the negative, power over life represented by sovereignty, biopower is a productive form of power that either fosters life or disallows "it to the point of death". Biopower was introduced through various techniques and calculations which targeted individual bodies (disciplinary dispositifs of control) and broader populations (regulatory mechanisms of control). This definition is repeated in his famous "biopolitical" lecture in Society Must Be Defended.

Foucault first discussed his thoughts on biopolitics in his lecture series Society Must Be Defended given at the Collège de France from 1975 to 1976. Foucault's concept of biopolitics is largely derived from his own notion of biopower, and the extension of state power over both the physical and political bodies of a population. While only mentioned briefly in Society Must Be Defended, the conceptualisation of biopolitics developed by Foucault there and subsequent lectures and books has become prominent in social science and the humanities.

Foucault described biopolitics as "a new technology of power...[that] exists at a different level, on a different scale, and [that] has a different bearing area, and makes use of very different instruments." More than a disciplinary mechanism, Foucault's biopolitics acts as a control apparatus exerted over a population as a whole or, as Foucault stated, "a global mass." In the years that followed, Foucault continued to develop his notions of the biopolitical in subsequent lectures to the Collège de France over the next two years, which are published under the titles Security, Territory, Population, and The Birth of Biopolitics.

Foucault gave numerous examples of biopolitical control when he first mentioned the concept in 1976. These examples include "ratio of births to deaths, the rate of reproduction, the fertility of a population, and so on." He contrasted this method of social control with political power in the Middle Ages. Whereas in the Middle Ages pandemics made death a permanent and perpetual part of life, this was then shifted around the end of the 18th century with the introduction of milieu into the biological sciences. Foucault then gives different contrasts to the then physical sciences in which the industrialisation of the population was coming to the fore through the concept of work, where Foucault then argues power starts to become a target for this milieu by the 17th century. The development of vaccines and medicines dealing with public hygiene allowed death to be held (and/or withheld) from certain populations. This was the introduction of "more subtle, more rational mechanisms: insurance, individual and collective savings, safety measures, and so on."

== Strains of biopolitics ==
Greg Bird and Heather Lynch argue that the "biopolitical is a composite mixture of heterogeneous, and sometimes conflicting, forces, discourses, institutions, laws, and practices that are embedded in and animated by material social relations." Biopolitics represents not only a blending and mixing of the biological with the political, as "life is biologized, politics is biologized and biology is politicized," but also with the economy. They argue there are at least three main strains in contemporary biopolitics. In the French and Italian readings, represented by theorists such as Antonio Negri, Giorgio Agamben, and Roberto Esposito, the focus has turned to how neoliberalism economizes politics and life. On the opposite end, the Anglo-American strain focuses more on the biologicization of life. Questions of the science and technology are central in these texts, highlighted in the studies of Nikolas Rose. The third strain is represented by necropolitics stemming from the work of Achille Mbembe. Mbembe takes the normative distinction between two classes of life (bíos and zoe) emphasized by the Italian tradition and combines it with what Foucault famously called the "death-function" of biopolitics. In his essay, Mbembe addresses how colonial regimes subject the colonized to a "death world", providing an example of life in the Gaza Strip. Others such as Jasbir Puar have used necropower to examine how the Israeli colonial apparatus maintains control over Palestinians by strategically debilitating and maiming Palestinians. This necropolitical turn, with concepts such as "death worlds", "walking dead", and "slow death", has become popular in theories of decoloniality and queer theory.

== Giorgio Agamben ==
Italian philosopher and legal theorist Giorgio Agamben's theory of biopolitics critiques that of Foucault, citing his predecessor's supposition as overly simplistic and lacking legal framework. Agamben's biopolitics is based on a distinction between three types of life: natural life, political life, and bare life – tracing the birth of biopolitics back to ancient Greece, opposing Foucault's focus on modernity. Ancient Greek philosophy details a separation of bíos – meaning a form of life – and zoē – the sheer fact of biological existence, also known as bare life. This distinction parallels the ancient Roman law of homo sacer – he who could be killed but not sacrificed.

Agamben theorises that sovereign power (the state) needs to perpetually produce bare life (homo sacer) in order to reproduce itself – applying biopolitics as a tool to maintain control. Agamben's idea of biopolitics ultimately culminates into a theory of 'the state of exception' where certain groups within society – such as inmates – are precluded from basic human rights (no trial, no political life – they are bare life). This darker side of biopolitics mediates the often violent exclusion of some forms of life from the more general population: rendering them less than human.

== Roberto Esposito ==
Starting in the early 2000s, Italian philosopher Roberto Esposito has sought to counter the negative tendencies in biopolitical philosophy. He argues that modern biopolitical regimes are defined by a series of negative immunizing dispositifs that are designed to protect life, by denying other life. Esposito examines the bio-medical dimensions of this dispositif in Immunitas: The Protection and Negation of Life (2002, 2011). Then in Bíos: Biopolitics and Philosophy (2004, 2008) he conducts a genealogical study of the history of biopolitical thought. He argues that contrary to the "negative biopolitics" of many interpreters of Foucault, including Giorgio Agamben who views biopolitical governmentality and biopower as domination and control over life, we need to imagine biopolitics differently, in an "affirmative" manner. In a politics of life, not over life, life's potential can be fostered, and alternative forms of existence can flourish.

Esposito returns to issue of an affirmative philosophy in Politics and Negation: For an Affirmative Philosophy (2019), which he then applies in his series of studies on the relationship between human life and institutions. He argues that the two are not opposed to each other, but that institutions serve a vital need, in the instituting power of life. In the final book of the series Vitam Instituere (2025), he deploys the concept of "institution vitae" from Roman law, which he argues can be used to conceive of politics as an institutent force.

== In the colonial setting ==
Biopolitics, read as a variation of Foucault's biopower, has proven to be a substantive concept in the field of postcolonial studies. Foucault's term refers to the intersection between power (political, economic, judicial etc.) and the individual's bodily autonomy. According to postcolonial theorists, present within the colonial setting are various mechanisms of power that consolidate the political authority of the colonizer; Biopolitics is thus the means by which a colonising force utilises political power to regulate and control the bodily autonomy of the colonized subject, who are oppressed and subaltern. In his book Orientalism, Edward Said analysed the means by which colonial powers rationalised their relationship with the colonized societies they inhabited through discursive means, and how these discourses continue to influence modern-day depictions of the Orient. Frantz Fanon applied a psychoanalytic frame to his theories of subjectivity, arguing that the subjectivity of the colonized is in constant dialogue with the oppressive political power of the colonizer, a mirroring of the Oedipal father-son dynamic. While not using the term himself, Fanon's work has been cited as a major development in the conceptualisation of biopolitics in the colonial setting. Maya Mikdashi applies this concept in her book Sextarianism to the state organisation of the Lebanese State under French mandate-rule in which the classification of sects and the specific categories within citizenship law enforced a desirable vision of family and marital relationships in the perspective of the colonial rulers.

== Alternative usages ==
One usage concerns the interplay and interdisciplinary studies relating biology and political science, primarily the study of the relationship between biology and political behavior. Most of these works agree on three fundamental aspects. First, the object of investigation is primarily political behavior, which—and this is the underlying assumption—is caused in a substantial way by objectively demonstrable biological factors. For example, the relationship of biology and political orientation, but also biological correlates of partisanship and voting behavior. (See also sociobiology.) Note here Ernst Haeckel's famous proposition that "[p]olitics is applied biology".

Another common usage is per a political spectrum that reflects and or advocates various positions towards regarding the biotech revolution.

A less common one sometimes surfaces in the green politics of bioregionalism.
