= Dominic D. P. Johnson =

British academic

Dominic Johnson
- Education: University of Derby (BSc); University of Oxford (MSc, D.Phil.); Open University (B.A.); University of Geneva (D.E.A., PhD)
- Scientific career
- Fields: Evolution, Politics
- Workplaces: University of Oxford
- Website: dominicdpjohnson.com

Dominic D. P. Johnson is an Alistair Buchan Professor of International Relations at St Antony's College, Oxford.

== Education ==
He received a D. Phil. in biology from the University of Oxford in 2001 and a PhD in political science from the University of Geneva in 2004. Drawing on both disciplines, he researches and writes on the role of human biology and evolution in understanding the behaviour of individuals, groups, organizations, and states.

== Career ==
Johnson held several post-doctoral fellowships in the United States prior to being hired at Edinburgh. He was a National Security Fellow at the Olin Institute for Strategic Studies at Harvard University 2002–2003, a Science Fellow at the Center for International Security and Cooperation at Stanford University 2003–2004, a visiting Fellow in the Global Fellows Program of the International Institute at the University of California, Los Angeles 2004–2006, and a Fellow in the Society of Fellows at Princeton University, 2004–2007, where he was also a lecturer at Princeton's Woodrow Wilson School of Public and International Affairs. He was also a Society in Science Branco Weiss Fellow from 2004 to 2009.

== Work ==
In addition to over forty articles published in academic journals and edited books, he is the author of three books. "Overconfidence and War: The Havoc and Glory of Positive Illusions" (Harvard University Press, 2004), argues that the widespread human tendency to maintain overly positive images of ourselves, of our control over events, and of the future (positive illusions), play a key role in the causes of war. "Failing to Win: Perceptions of Victory and Defeat in International Politics" (Harvard University Press, 2006), with Dominic Tierney, explores how common psychological biases generate powerful misconceptions about the success and failure of political events, altering the lessons that people learn from history. "Failing to Win" won the 2006 Best Book Award from the International Studies Association.

== Awards and recognition ==
- 2001: 2nd prize in business plan competition, National Environment Research Council
- 2004: Best PhD from Geneva University during 2002–04, Swiss Political Science Association
- 2005: Overconfidence and War named an Honor Book, New Jersey Council for the Humanities
- 2008: Failing to Win named Best Book in International Studies, International Studies Association
- 2011: Chancellor's "Rising Star" Award, University of Edinburgh

== Bibliography ==
=== Books ===
- Overconfidence and War: The Havoc and Glory of Positive Illusion. Cambridge, Massachusetts: Harvard University Press. 2004. ISBN 978-0-6740-1576-0.
- Failing to Win. Perceptions of Victory and Defeat in International Politics. Cambridge, Massachusetts: Harvard University Press. 2006. ISBN 978-0-6740-2324-6. With Dominic Tierney.
- God Is Watching You. How the Fear of God Makes Us Human. Oxford: Oxford University Press. 2016. ISBN 978-0-1998-9563-2.

=== Selected articles ===
- Johnson, Dominic DP, and James H. Fowler. "The evolution of overconfidence." Nature 477.7364 (2011): 317–320.
- King, AJ, Johnson, DDP & Van Vugt, M (2009) The origins and evolution of leadership. Current Biology 19 (19): 1591–1682.
- Johnson, DDP, & Levin, SA (2009) The tragedy of cognition: psychological biases and environmental inaction. Current Science 97 (11): 1593–1603.
- McDermott, R, Tingley, D, Cowden, J, Frazzetto, G. & Johnson, DDP (2009) Monoamine oxidase A gene (MAOA) predicts behavioral aggression following provocation. Proceedings of the National Academy of Sciences doi:10.1073/pnas.0808376106.
- Johnson, DDP, McDermott, R, Barrett, ES, Cowden, J, Wrangham, R, McIntyre, MH & Rosen, SP (2006) Overconfidence in wargames: experimental evidence on expectations, aggression, gender and testosterone. Proceedings of the Royal Society (B) 273 (1600): 2513–2520.
- Johnson, DDP & Bering, JM (2006) Hand of God, mind of man: punishment and cognition in the evolution of cooperation. Evolutionary Psychology 4: 219–233.
- Johnson, DDP (2005) God's punishment and public goods: A test of the supernatural punishment hypothesis in 186 world cultures. Human Nature 16 (4): 410–446.
