= Biology and political orientation =

Correlation between human biology and political tendencies

A number of studies have found that human biology may be linked with political orientation. This means that an individual's biology may predispose them to a particular political orientation and ideology or, conversely, that subscription to certain ideologies may predispose them to measurable biological and health outcomes.

One 2011 study, for instance, found that subjects with right-wing (or conservative in the United States) political views have a larger amygdala, an area of the brain associated with emotional responses such as fear, anxiety, and aggression. Based on such findings, some scholars argue that genetic factors account for at least some of the variation of political views. However, there is considerable disagreement among experts as to whether biological explanations for differences in political orientation are methodologically sound, and many studies which purport to demonstrate a connection have not been replicated.

From the perspective of evolutionary psychology, conflicts regarding redistribution of wealth may have been common in the ancestral environment and humans may have developed psychological mechanisms for judging their own chances of succeeding in such conflicts. Some researchers speculate that such mechanisms may affect political views.

== Brain studies ==
In the 2011 study by neuroscientist Ryota Kanai (n=90 students), the subjects who expressed conservative views (right) tended to have a larger amygdala than those who expressed liberal views (left).

A 2011 study by cognitive neuroscientist Ryota Kanai at University College London found structural brain differences between subjects of different political orientation in a convenience sample of students at the same college. The researchers performed MRI scans on the brains of 90 volunteer students who had indicated their political orientation on a five-point scale ranging from "very liberal" to "very conservative".

Students who reported more conservative political views were found to have a larger amygdala, a structure in the temporal lobewhose primary function is in the formation, consolidation and processing of memory, as well as positive and negative conditioning (emotional learning). The amygdala is responsible for important roles in social interaction, such as the recognition of emotional cues in facial expressions and the monitoring of personal space, with larger amygdalae correlating with larger and more complex social networks. It is also postulated to play a role in threat detection, including modulation of fear and aggression to perceived threats. Conservative students were also found to have greater volume of gray matter in the left insula and the right entorhinal cortex. There is evidence that conservatives are more sensitive to disgust and one role of the insula is in the modulation of social emotions, such as the feeling of disgust to specific sights, smells and norm violations.

Students who reported more liberal political views were found to have a larger volume of grey matter in the anterior cingulate cortex, a structure of the brain associated with emotional awareness and the emotional processing of pain. The anterior cingulate cortex becomes active in situations of uncertainty, and is postulated to play a role in error detection, such as the monitoring and processing of conflicting stimuli or information.

The authors concluded, "Although our data do not determine whether these regions play a causal role in the formation of political attitudes, they converge with previous work to suggest a possible link between brain structure and psychological mechanisms that mediate political attitudes." In an interview with LiveScience, Ryota Kanai said, "It's very unlikely that actual political orientation is directly encoded in these brain regions", and that "more work is needed to determine how these brain structures mediate the formation of political attitude." Kanai and colleagues added that it is necessary to conduct a longitudinal study to determine whether the changes in brain structure that we observed lead to changes in political behavior or whether political attitudes and behavior instead result in changes of brain structure.

A 2024 study by Petalas et al achieved a partial replication of Kanai et al, using a larger sample size of 928 subjects, making it the largest preregistered replication study in political neuroscience to date. A positive relationship between the size of the amygdala and right-wing political views was found but at approximately a third of the effect size of the original study (r = 0.068 vs r = 0.23). The study also did not find a replication of the original finding of a positive relationship between a larger volume of grey matter in the anterior cingulate cortex and left-wing political views.

=== Intelligence ===
A 2022 meta-analysis of cognitive studies found a "weak average association" between cognitive abilities and economic conservatism. It found support for two contrary effects in this relationship - the self-interest of economically higher status individuals supporting a relationship between economic conservatism and cognitive ability, and the need for certainty, which operated to diminish that relationship. However, it warned that the extant research it drew on was heterogenous in form, with different sampling methods, different locations, and different definitions producing different results.

== Functional differences ==
=== Psychometrics ===
Various studies suggest measurable differences in the psychological traits of liberals and conservatives. Conservatives are more likely to self-report larger social networks, greater happiness and self-esteem than liberals, are more reactive to perceived threats and more likely to interpret ambiguous facial expressions as threatening. Liberals, in some studies, are more likely to report greater emotional distress, relationship dissatisfaction and experiential hardship than conservatives, and show more openness to experience as well as greater tolerance for uncertainty and disorder. However, the relationship between openness to experience and political orientation is correlational rather than causal. One 2025 research paper found that, regarding the previously reported mental health gap between ideological groups, "asking instead about overall mood eliminated the gap between liberals and conservatives." That paper suggested that concepts of "mental health" had "become increasingly politicized in the US", and "rather than a genuine mental health divide, conservatives may inflate their mental health ratings when asked, due to stigma surrounding the term. Another possibility is that ideological differences persist for some aspects of mental well-being, but not others."

=== Behavioral studies ===
A study by David Amodio et al. at New York University and the University of California, Los Angeles, found differences in how self-described liberal and conservative research participants responded to changes in patterns. Participants were asked to tap a keyboard when the letter "M" appeared on a computer monitor and to refrain from tapping when they saw a "W". The letter "M" appeared four times more frequently than "W", conditioning participants to press the keyboard when a letter appears. Liberal participants made fewer mistakes than conservatives during testing and their electroencephalograph readings showed more activity in the anterior cingulate cortex, the part of the brain that deals with conflicting information, during the experiment, suggesting that they were better able to detect conflicts in established patterns. Amodio warned against concluding that a particular political orientation is superior. He said: "The tendency of conservatives to block distracting information could be a good thing depending on the situation."

A 2017 study both replicated the original study and also found that conservatives performed better in a task in which choosing the simple strategy was the more optimal solution; while both liberals and conservatives started the task attempting the more complex but less effective strategy, conservatives switched to the simple strategy more quickly than liberals. Amodio's original study was also replicated by Weissflog et al. (2013) and Inzlicht et al. (2009). Conversely, Kremláček et al. (2019) and Wendell (2016) did not replicate Amodio's results. Both studies also argued that Weissflog and Inzlicht's results were not as concordant with the Amodio's findings as originally claimed.

A study of subjects' reported level of disgust linked to various scenarios showed that people who scored highly on the "disgust sensitivity" scale held more politically conservative views, which some researchers believe could be partially explained by personality traits. However, the findings of a 2019 study suggest that sensitivity to disgust among conservatives varies according to the elicitors used, and that using an elicitor-unspecific scale caused the differences in sensitivity to disappear between those of different political orientations.

A 2018 study of 15,001 participants in the United States looking at levels of cognitive reflection (the tendency to favour analytic reasoning over instinctive or "gut" responses) found that those who voted for Donald Trump in the 2016 US presidential election had lower levels of cognitive reflection than Hillary Clinton voters or third-party voters. However, this effect was mostly driven by Democrats who voted for Trump, while amongst Republicans, Clinton and Trump voters had more similar levels of cognitive reflection. Republicans who voted for third-party candidates or those who identified as libertarian had the highest levels of cognitive reflection.

=== Physiology ===
Oxley et al. (2008) found that people with right-wing views had greater skin conductance response, indicating greater sympathetic nervous system response, to threatening images than those with left-wing views. However, subsequent studies with substantially greater statistical power failed to replicate these findings.

In an fMRI study published in Social Neuroscience, three different patterns of brain activation were found to correlate with individualism, conservatism, and radicalism. In general, fMRI responses in several portions of the brain have been linked to viewing of the faces of well-known politicians. Others believe that determining political affiliation from fMRI data is overreaching.

== Genetic studies ==
=== Heritability ===
Heritability compares differences in genetic factors in individuals to the total variance of observable characteristics ("phenotypes") in a population, to determine the heritability coefficient. Factors including genetics, environment and random chance can all contribute to the variation in individuals' phenotypes.

The use of twin studies assumes the elimination of non-genetic differences by finding the statistical differences between monozygotic (identical) twins, which have almost the same genes, and dizygotic (fraternal) twins. The similarity of the environment in which twins are reared has been questioned.

A twin study in 2005 by Alford et al. examined the attitudes regarding 28 different political issues such as capitalism, unions, X-rated movies, abortion, school prayer, divorce, property taxes, and the draft. Twins were asked if they agreed or disagreed or were uncertain about each issue. Genetic factors accounted for 53% of the variance of an overall score. However, self-identification as Republican and Democrat had a much lower heritability of 14%. It is worthwhile to note that identical twins correlated in opinion at a rate of 0.66 while fraternal twins correlated in opinion by 0.44. This likely occurs because identical twins share 100% of their DNA while fraternal twins share on average only 50% of their DNA. However, Jonathan Kaplan argued that the role of individual genes is often extremely small due to many human physical traits being polygenic and may be overstated, observing that the study by Alford et al. made a case for the role of the 5-HTTLPR region being involved in numerous psychological and personality traits, yet Border et al. (2019) found that multiple associations with 5-HTTLPR were spurious and underpowered.

Jost et al. wrote in a 2011 review that "Many studies involving quite diverse samples and methods suggest that political and religious views reflect a reasonably strong genetic basis, but this does not mean that ideological proclivities are unaffected by personal experiences or environmental factors."

=== Gene association studies ===
In 2014, a study was performed on genomic data from 12,000 twin pairs from Australia, the USA, Denmark, Sweden and Hungary to examine genetic influences on political ideology. The study's genome-wide association analysis did not provide any definitive evidence of a specific genetic marker related to ideology. The authors remarked that, as with any complex trait, a single gene or small group of genes would not influence ideology directly but that there would likely be "thousands of genetic variants of very small effects and constellations of genes interacting with each other and the environment to influence behavior, indirectly".

"A Genome-Wide Analysis of Liberal and Conservative Political Attitudes" by Peter K. Hatemi et al. traces DNA research involving 13,000 subjects. The study identifies several genes potentially connected with political ideology.

== Evolutionary psychology ==
From an evolutionary psychology perspective, conflicts regarding redistribution of wealth may have been a recurrent issue in the ancestral environment. Humans may therefore have developed psychological mechanisms for judging their chance of succeeding in such conflicts which will affect their political views. For males, physical strength may have been an important factor in deciding the outcome of such conflicts. Therefore, a prediction is that males that have high physical strength and low socioeconomic status (SES) will support redistribution while males that have both high SES and high physical strength will oppose redistribution. Cross-cultural research found this to be the case; for females, their physical strength had no influence on their political views. A study on political attitudes among Hollywood actors found that, while the actors were generally more left-leaning, male actors with great physical strength were more likely to support the Republican stance on foreign issues and foreign military interventions.

An alternative evolutionary explanation for political diversity is that it is a polymorphism, like those of gender and blood type, resulting from frequency-dependent selection. Tim Dean has suggested that we live in such a moral ecosystem whereby the advantage gained by having any one particular moral strategy diminishes as it becomes very common, causing evolution to produce individuals with a diversity of moral strategies. Alford et al. posit that political variation could offer groups different strategies of solving problems, thus variation is maintained by virtue of being adaptive at the group level.

== Criticism ==
Studies linking genes and biology with political ideology have been criticised. Evan Charney publishing in Perspectives on Politics argues that Alford et al.'s research is methodologically flawed, their data does not support their conclusions, and the creation of 'liberal' and 'conservative' 'phenotypes' is untenable. Furthermore, Doron Shultziner has also criticised the methodology and interpretation of twin studies used in the research supporting a connection between genetics and political ideology; arguing that identical twins are more likely to have similar political views is because they react to the environment in the same way. Shultziner further argues that the usage of the term "heritable" in the research has been questionable.

== See also ==
- Biology and political science
- Biological determinism
- Genopolitics
- Neuropolitics
