= National Longitudinal Study of Adolescent to Adult Health =

The National Longitudinal Study of Adolescent to Adult Health, also known as Add Health, is a multiwave longitudinal study of adolescents in the United States. It was begun in 1994 in response to a Congressional mandate to study adolescent health, and was initially called the National Longitudinal Study of Adolescent Health. The first wave of the study, funded by the Eunice Kennedy Shriver National Institute of Child Health and Human Development, involved administering a questionnaire to a nationally representative sample of 7th- through 12th-graders during the 1994-95 school year. In the first wave of the study, the questionnaire was administered to about 20,000 adolescents, making it one of the largest longitudinal surveys of adolescents ever conducted. The participants were then re-interviewed in 1996 (wave II), 2001–2002 (wave III), 2008–2009 (wave IV), 2016–2018 (wave V), and 2022–2025 (wave VI). In fall 2026, wave VII began. The first three waves included, among other information, detailed and sensitive interviews, and the 11,500 participants in wave III also provided urine and saliva samples.

== Objectives ==
The purpose of Waves I and II was to examine factors associated with health behaviors among adolescents. The purpose of Wave III, which was conducted when almost all participants were aged 18 to 26, was to determine the relationship between behaviors and experiences during adolescence and behaviors during the adjustment to young adulthood. The purpose of Wave IV, conducted when almost all participants were aged 24 to 32, was to assess developmental and health trajectories over the lifespan.
