= Ljiljana Progovac =

Serbian linguist

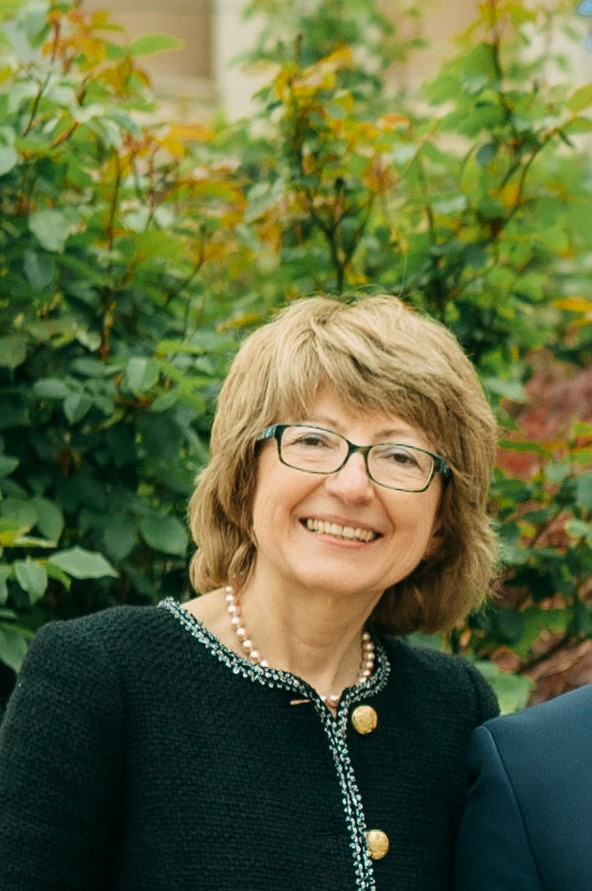
Ljiljana Progovac, Linguist and Author

Ljiljana Progovac is a Serbian linguist focusing on the evolution of language, with publications in syntax, Slavic syntax, origins of language, and human evolution. She is Distinguished Professor of Linguistics at Wayne State University.

== Biography ==
Progovac is a Distinguished Professor of Linguistics at Wayne State University in Detroit, Michigan, where she also served as the head of the Linguistics Program from 2007 to 2017. She grew up in Novi Sad, Serbia, where she got her BA degree in English and later held an assistant professorship at the University of Novi Sad. Supported partly by a Fulbright grant Progovac received her PhD degree from the University of Southern California with a dissertation on the syntactic aspects of negation and polarity, advised by Joseph E. Aoun.

== Work ==
=== Early theoretical work ===
Her work on theoretical syntax includes publications on negative concord and negative and positive polarity; coordination; reflexives; determiner phrase; aspect; small clauses and nonsententials/fragments. This background in theoretical syntax directly informs her work on language evolution.

=== Origin of language ===
==== "Living fossils" ====
Progovac used syntactic theory to reconstruct the earliest forms of grammar, which she calls proxies or "living fossils" of these early grammars in modern language. She proposed that the closest approximation of these living fossils usually involve playful but derogatory compounds often used for naming, nicknaming, or verbal aggression. The idea of linguistic 'living fossils' builds on Ray Jackendoff's work; and is discussed further in Progovac's 2019 book. Progovac and colleagues' fMRI experiments found these types of compounds and other proxies of early grammars are processed differently by the brain, noting specific differences in the fusiform gyrus (BA 37), Broca's BA 44 area, and the basal ganglia.

==== Survival of the Wittiest ====
Progovac proposed human language evolution should be characterized as Survival of the Wittiest in a 2024 conference paper. The theory behind this characterization is that the gradual evolution of language capabilities in humans (including grammar/syntax) actually played a causal role in shaping human brains and cognition via natural/sexual selection. Specifically, eloquence, quick-wittedness, and humor may have gradually contributed towards replacing physical aggression with more adaptive verbal aggression and cognitive contest. This is in contrast with the "Survival of the Friendliest" proposal advanced by Brian Hare.

== In popular media ==
- An interview with Progovac was published in NewScientist in 2024 (Dec. 21), in the article "Survival of the wittiest: Could ancient two-word insults have spurred the evolution of complex language," by Colin Barras"
- Progovac's work is mentioned in 2024 (July 11) New York Times article "What a linguist hears when Biden speaks," by John McWhorter
- An interview with Progovac was published in NewScientist in 2013 (Dec. 30), in the article "Rude awakenings: How swearing made us human," by Tiffany O'Callaghan.

== Books ==
1. Progovac, L. (1994) Negative and Positive Polarity: A Binding Approach. Cambridge Studies in Linguistics 68. Cambridge University Press.
2. Progovac, L. (2005) A Syntax of Serbian: Clausal Architecture. Slavica Publishers, Bloomington, Indiana.
3. Progovac, L. (2015) Evolutionary Syntax. Oxford Studies in the Evolution of Language. Oxford: Oxford University Press. DOI: 10.1093/acprof:oso/9780198736547.001.0001
4. Progovac, L. (2019) A Critical Introduction to Language Evolution: Current Controversies and Future Prospects. Springer Briefs in Linguistics: Expert Briefs. Cham, Switzerland: Springer.
