= Wild ancestor =

Original species from which domesticated plants and animals derive

Wild ancestors are the original species from which domesticated plants and animals are derived. Examples include dogs which are derived from wolves and flax which is derived from Linum bienne. In most cases the wild ancestor species still exists, but some domesticated species, such as camels, have no surviving wild relatives. In many cases there is considerable debate in the scientific community about the identity of the wild ancestor or ancestors, as the process of domestication involves natural selection, artificial selection, and hybridization.

Wild ancestors have gone through genetic changes to achieve biological mutualism with humans. This is due to humans selectively breeding those species.

== Theory ==
All living creatures are derived from a common wild ancestor. With time and the help of humans or nature, living beings adapt to their surroundings by gradual changes whether visible or not. According to Darwin, there are two different categories that may cause wild ancestors to change to their modern or domesticated counterparts: natural selection and artificial selection. Natural selection, as the name suggests, is environmentally driven; this occurs when more advantageous traits are passed down ensuring survival of the fittest, whereas artificial selection occurs through humans intentionally breeding creatures to attain desirable traits. Both of these allow the wild ancestors to evolve.

Ancestors of two different species may overlap. A term for this is concestor—coined by Nicky Warren—from the book The Ancestor's Tale by Richard Dawkins.

Generally, wild ancestors have a similar genetic code to their descendants, although different or additional gene mutations are found in their modern counterparts.

=== Wild ancestors in animals ===
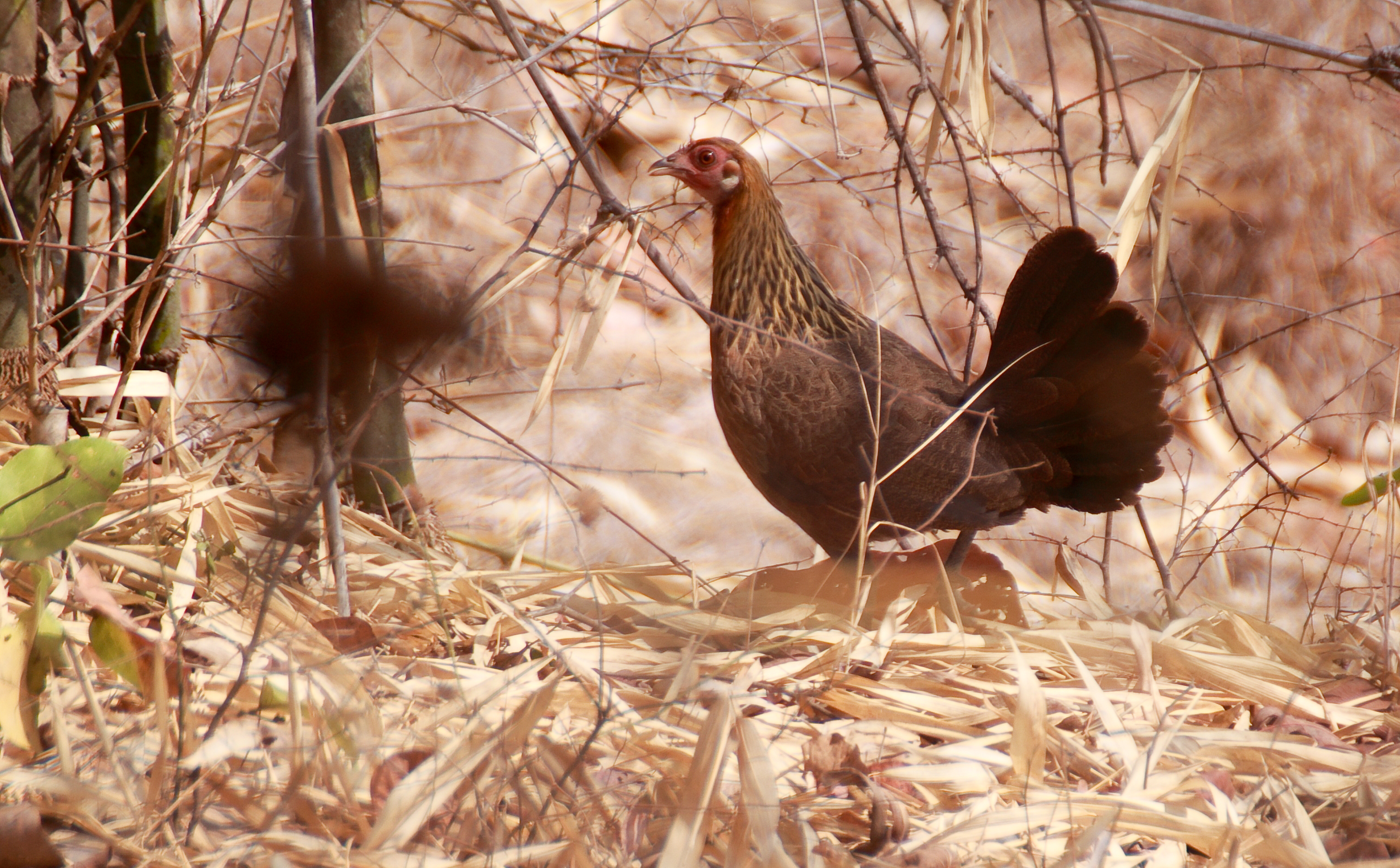
The red junglefowl (Gallus gallus), often believed to be an ancestor of the domestic chicken.

Most animals are tuned to modern life by artificial selection. This is either due to the pressure of early hunter-gatherers' attempts to stabilise the food supply, which resulted in the existence of domesticated farm animals, or domestication of pets which are useful to humans. Different animal species undergo different pathways of domestication although they almost always result in one common trait, which is tolerance of proximity to humans or lack of fear of humans and increased reproductivity.

An example of the wild ancestor of an animal bred as a food source is in chickens. The ancestor of the domesticated chicken, the red junglefowl, is believed to have an origin in parts of South and Southeast Asia. Around 8,000 years ago humans started to breed this species for food. A study has shown that the act of domestication for the chickens caused the gene mutation involving a gene known as TSHR, which was found only in domestic populations. This implied that this gene in particular may have some involvement in the domestication of bird species.

The domestication of the wolf is a different process altogether as it is the result of two interwoven processes which happened during the nomadic period of hunter-gatherers in humans. The process started by less fearful wolves scavenging in human settlements and the humans utilising their presence as an alarm, which may warn humans of invaders whether it be humans or predatory animals approaching at night (Lindsay, 2000). Afterwards, the process of self-domestication of the wolves began. Wolves with friendly traits have a higher chance of survival as conflicts with humans are lessened. As friendlier wolves bred together for generations, they gradually evolved into the modern domestic dog. In this case of domestication, the phases of natural and artificial selection were blended together.

In other cases, animals adapt to their ecology, and since the environment continuously differs, they continually adapt and change as well. They may also migrate and branch off and evolve into a new species.

=== Wild ancestors in plants ===
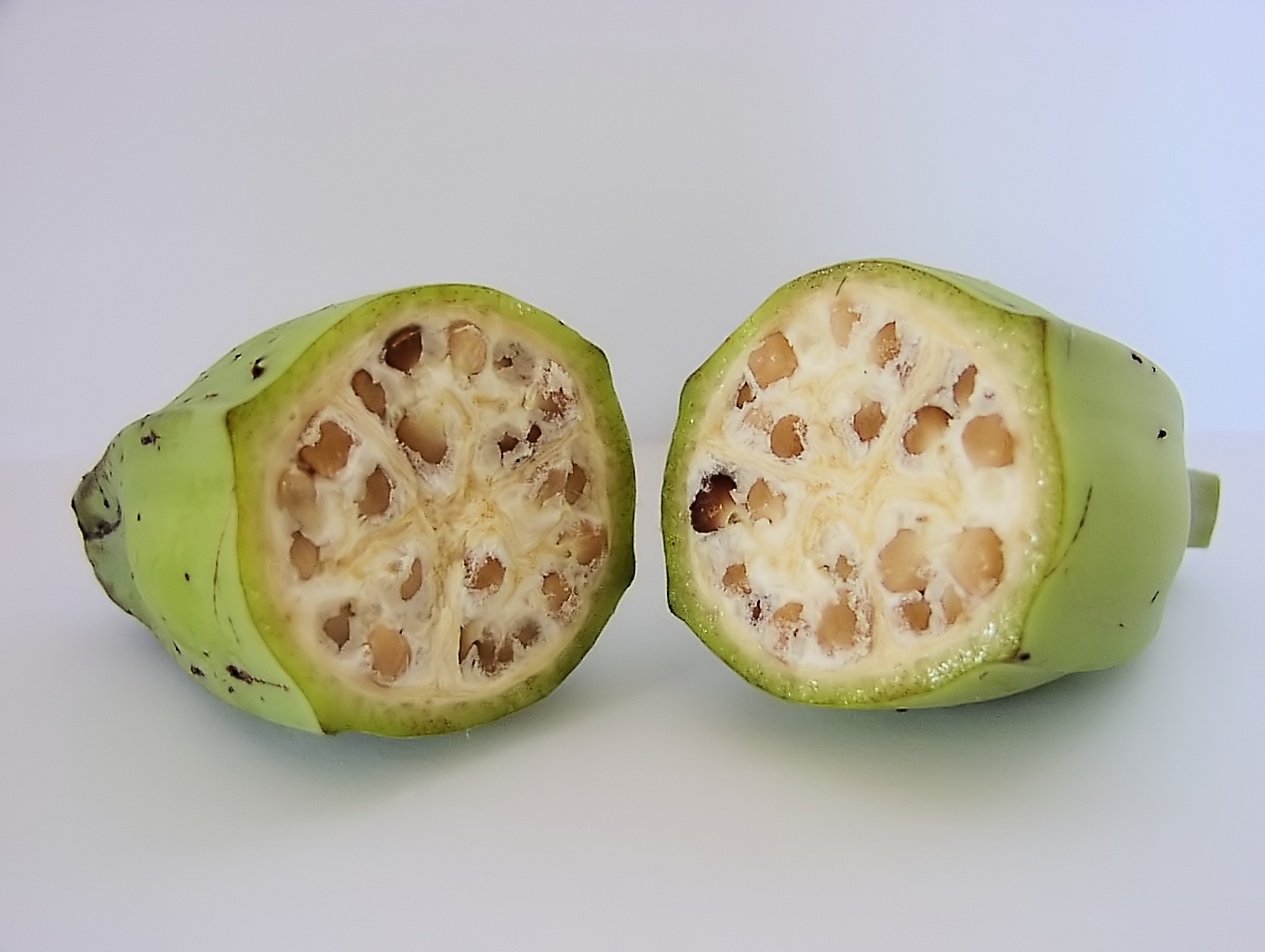
A species of wild banana, the appearance and taste of which differ from that of cultivated bananas.

Thousands of years ago, humans started to settle and grow crops. This change in human behaviour from nomadic to sedentary marked the start of the domestication process of plants. Many wild ancestors of plants still coexist with the modern domesticated crops; these are called crop wild relatives. A lot of crop plants were also moved into human-managed conditions which caused the selection pressures to differ from the plants in their normal environment creating a significant difference in traits, life cycle and appearance compared to the original predecessor.

Many significant changes can be seen in modern cultivated watermelons (Citrullus lanatus), which are believed to have derived from Citrullus colocynthis after being domesticated as a water and food source in northeastern Africa over 4000 years ago. Citrullus colocynthis, which now still exists as a crop wild relative known as the desert gourd or thorny apple, were small, bitter in taste and yellow or green inside, while modern watermelons are mainly large, red or yellow in color and sweet tasting. The same goes for other common crops cultivated nowadays; most of them have evolved to be suited to the human palate.

== Wild ancestors and their domesticated counterparts ==
=== Differences ===
Compared to their wild ancestors, the domesticated counterparts of living creatures underwent several changes depending on various factors and pathways of evolution.

==== Physical appearance ====
Domestic animals show differences in physical appearance in comparison to their wild ancestors as they underwent some changes such as having floppier ears, bigger skulls, curlier tail and changes in coat colour or pattern, as noted in domestications of dogs and the experimental domesticated red fox in Russia by Dmitry Belyayev. Changes in physical appearance which are caused by selective breeding can be seen in pets such as koi fish and betta fish which are bred for aesthetic purposes or dogs bred for extreme physical appearances (e.g. extremely short snouts in pugs or bulldogs, short limbs on dachshunds, extremely small sizes in "teacup dogs"). Extreme physical appearances in selectively bred animals may cause health problems, which may cause wild ancestors to have longer natural lifespans.

==== Behavior ====
Behavioral differences in wild ancestors were caused by differences in brain structures compared to their domesticated counterparts. An example of this can be seen when comparing wild and domestic rabbits. Wild rabbits have a larger ratio of brain-to-body size, while domestic rabbits have a smaller amygdala and larger medial prefrontal cortex and also reduced white matter. This causes domestic rabbits to have a decreased fight-or-flight response and thus domesticated rabbits show less indication of fear towards humans. Subsequently, a decrease in awareness of their surroundings may be observed in domesticated animals because of the reduced need to sense natural predators.

Generally a change in mating systems may be observed in its domesticated counterparts. Seasonal mating systems tend to only exist in wild ancestors; however, most domesticated animals have a tendency to breed all year long. The deterioration of monogamous systems may also be seen along with wider mating preferences. These traits may be more commonly seen in domesticated farm animals or pets as they are beneficial to humans.

==== Intelligence ====
As living creatures adapt and evolve, the level of intelligence changes to suit their way of living. The level of intelligence of modern humans is considerably higher compared to the hominid ancestors from millions of years ago, among which during this time the volume of the hominid brain began to gradually increase starting from about 600 cm^{3} in Homo habilis up to 1500 cm^{3} in Homo neanderthalensis. Although the evolution of humans increases the level of intelligence, the same may not be observed in other animals, especially animals which have great dependence to humans – for example, dogs. While different breeds of modern dogs possess different brain capacity and intelligence, in general, compared to the wolf, the dog's problem-solving capabilities have declined. In a problem-solving experiment, the average success rate for dogs was 5% while the wolves obtained an 80% success rate. On the other hand, in a test on guinea pigs, it was shown that the spatial ability of domestic guinea pigs is higher compared to their ancestor. The level of intelligence in wild ancestors compared to the predecessor differs from species to species as brain volume and behaviour changes.

==== Genetics ====
The presence of genetic mutations increases genetic variance across species group. Mutations which are found to be beneficial for the longevity of the species as a whole are likely to be inherited in the next generation; due to this process, genetic difference has become the driving factor of most, if not all of the changes in wild ancestors compared to their predecessors. As wild ancestor species evolve, there are certain genes which would indicate their evolutionary paths. Creatures which would undergo domestication have changes in genes which alter their endocrine systems and hormonal production which can be seen in animals such as domesticated birds, canids, cattle and house pets. This can be seen in the mutation of the thyroid stimulating hormone receptor gene (TSHR) in the domesticated chicken, which affects the reproductive system. In the domestic fox experiment, the gene SorCS1 was found in tame foxes but not in aggressive foxes; this gene is thought to be responsible for the tameness trait in domestic foxes.

==== Differences in plants ====
Plants that are bred for crops or food production are selectively bred for increased efficiency, and relatively better taste. Hence, the differences in wild ancestors and cultivated modern crops will reflect that, for example, an increased size of the edible parts of certain fruits.

Domestication syndrome in plants causes differences such as larger sizes, changes in colour and differences in sugar content. The adaptability of modern plants may also be increased compared to their wild ancestors.

Cultivated plants show differences in chemical content compared to their wild counterparts. For example, research has shown that cultivated plants generally produce litter which decomposes faster and is easier to be recycled compared to wild plants. Wild plants which had to generally thrive in nutrient-poor soils promote a higher content of recalcitrant molecules, such as lignin. This stimulates an increase in plant litter toughness, causing it to decompose longer.

Other differences may include:

- loss of seed dormancy
- new adaptations to ecological factors such as nutrient composition of the soil, temperature, acidity, light levels, humidity, etc.
- difference in the method of reproduction (e.g. lack of pollinating organs, depending on human intervention) or even sterility in modern plants.
- differences in chemical composition (e.g. increase in vitamins, sugar content, etc.)
- loss of seed dispersal methods
- a decrease in defensive mechanisms. Since traits such as thorns, spines, protective coverings and poison are less desirable to humans, they are lost to artificial selection. This renders modern plants more susceptible to pests.
- difference in disease susceptibility

== Uses ==
There are uses of coexisting wild ancestors and their domestic counterparts. The existence of a wild ancestor may be used to increase biodiversity of the variety of species. It mainly helps with conservation but may also be used for genetic improvements, though this practice is mainly done on plants, more specifically food-producing crops. Since wild crops generally have a higher pest resistance, breeding plant hybrids would significantly improve the quality of the cultivated crops. The same technique may be applied to increase bacterial resistance, plant yield, and resistance to biotic stress.

== List of wild ancestors and their domesticated counterparts ==
=== Animals ===
Species and subspecies	Wild ancestor
Dog (Canis familiaris)	Extinct Pleistocene population of Gray wolf (Canis lupus)
Cattle (Bos Taurus)	Extinct Aurochs (Bos primigenius)
Domestic guinea pig (Cavia porcellus)	Montane guinea pig (Cavia tschudii) or cavy (Cavia aperea)
Chicken (Gallus gallus domesticus)	Red junglefowl (Gallus gallus)
Domesticated rabbit (Oryctolagus cuniculus)	European rabbit (Oryctolagus cuniculus)
Goat (Capra aegagrus hircus)	Bezoar ibex (Capra aegagrus aegagrus)
Ferret (Mustela putorius furo)	European polecat (Mustela putorius)
Cat (Felis catus)	African wildcat (Felis lybica)

=== Plants ===
Species and subspecies	Wild ancestor
Banana	Musa acuminata or plantain (Musa balbisiana)
Squash (Cucurbita pepo subsp. pepo)	Okeechobee gourd (Cucurbita okeechobeensis)
Watermelon (C.lanatus)	Desert gourd (Citrullus colonchythis)
Eggplant (Solanum melongena)	Thorn apple (Solanum incanum)
Apricot (Prunus armeniaca)	Briançon apricot (Prunus brigantina)
Cassava (Manihot esculenta subsp. esculenta)	Walker's manihot (Manihot walkerae)
