= Rachis =

Biological term for axis or shaft

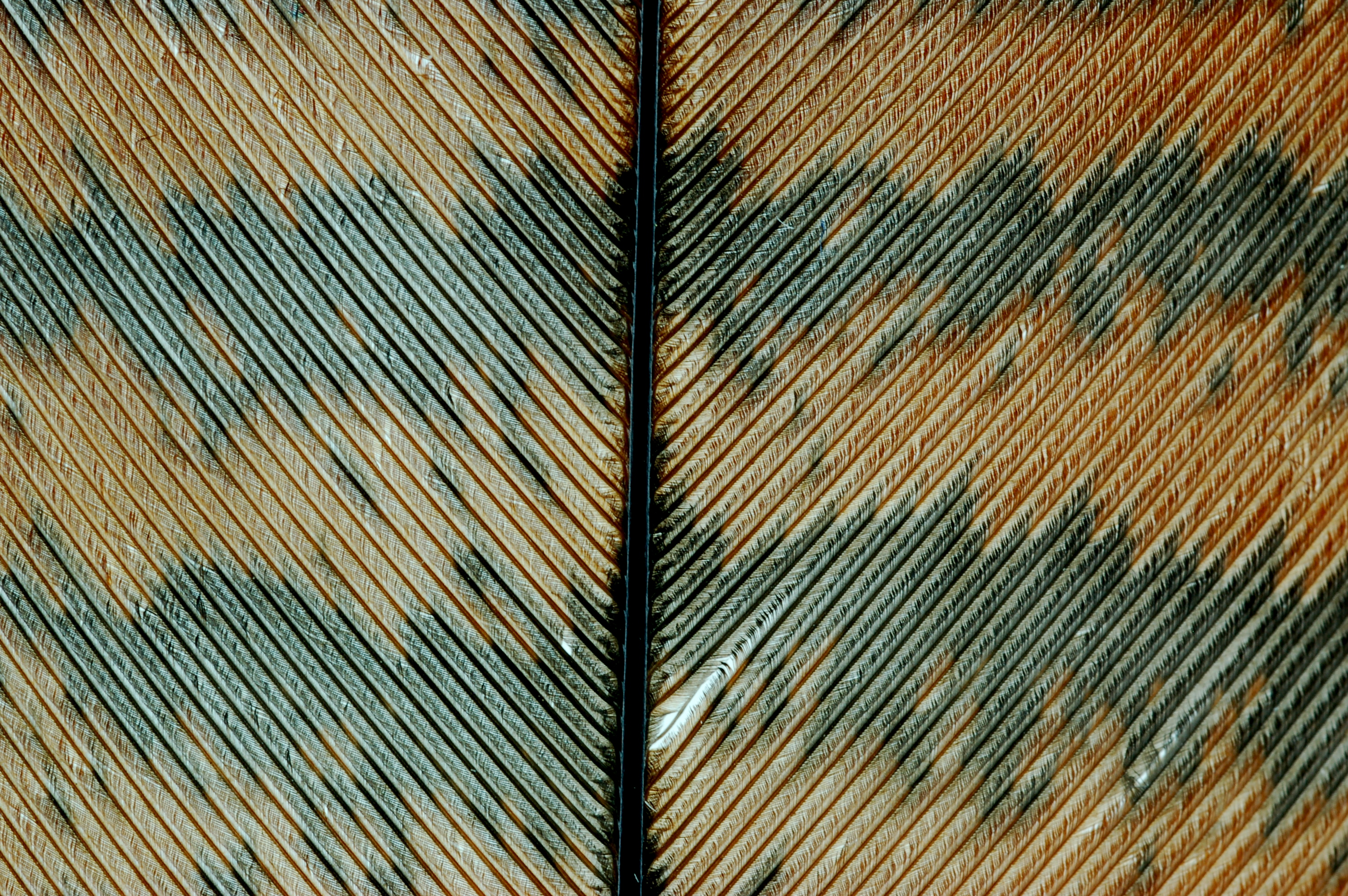
The dark rachis of a wild turkey feather

In biology, a rachis /ˈreɪkɪs/ (from the Ancient Greek: ῥάχις [rhákhis], "backbone, spine") is a main axis or "shaft".

== In zoology and microbiology ==
In vertebrates, rachis is the series of articulated vertebrae, which encase the spinal cord. The rachis forms the supporting axis of the body and is then called the spine or vertebral column.

In birds the rachis is the central shaft of pennaceous feathers.

In the gonad of the invertebrate nematode Caenorhabditis elegans, a rachis is the central cell-free core or axis of the gonadal arm of both adult males and hermaphrodites where the germ cells have achieved pachytene and are attached to the walls of the gonadal tube. The rachis is filled with cytoplasm.

== In botany ==
In plants, a rachis is the main axis of a compound structure. It can be the main stem of a compound leaf, such as in Acacia or ferns, or the main, flower-bearing portion of an inflorescence above a supporting peduncle. Where it subdivides into further branches, these are known as rachillae (singular rachilla). The central spine that remains when an Abies seed cone disintegrates is also called the rachis.

A ripe head of wild-type wheat is easily shattered into dispersal units when touched or blown by the wind. A series of abscission layers forms that divides the rachis into dispersal units consisting of a small group of flowers (a single spikelet) attached to a short segment of the rachis. This is significant in the history of agriculture, and referred to by archaeologists as a "brittle rachis", one type of shattering in crop plants.

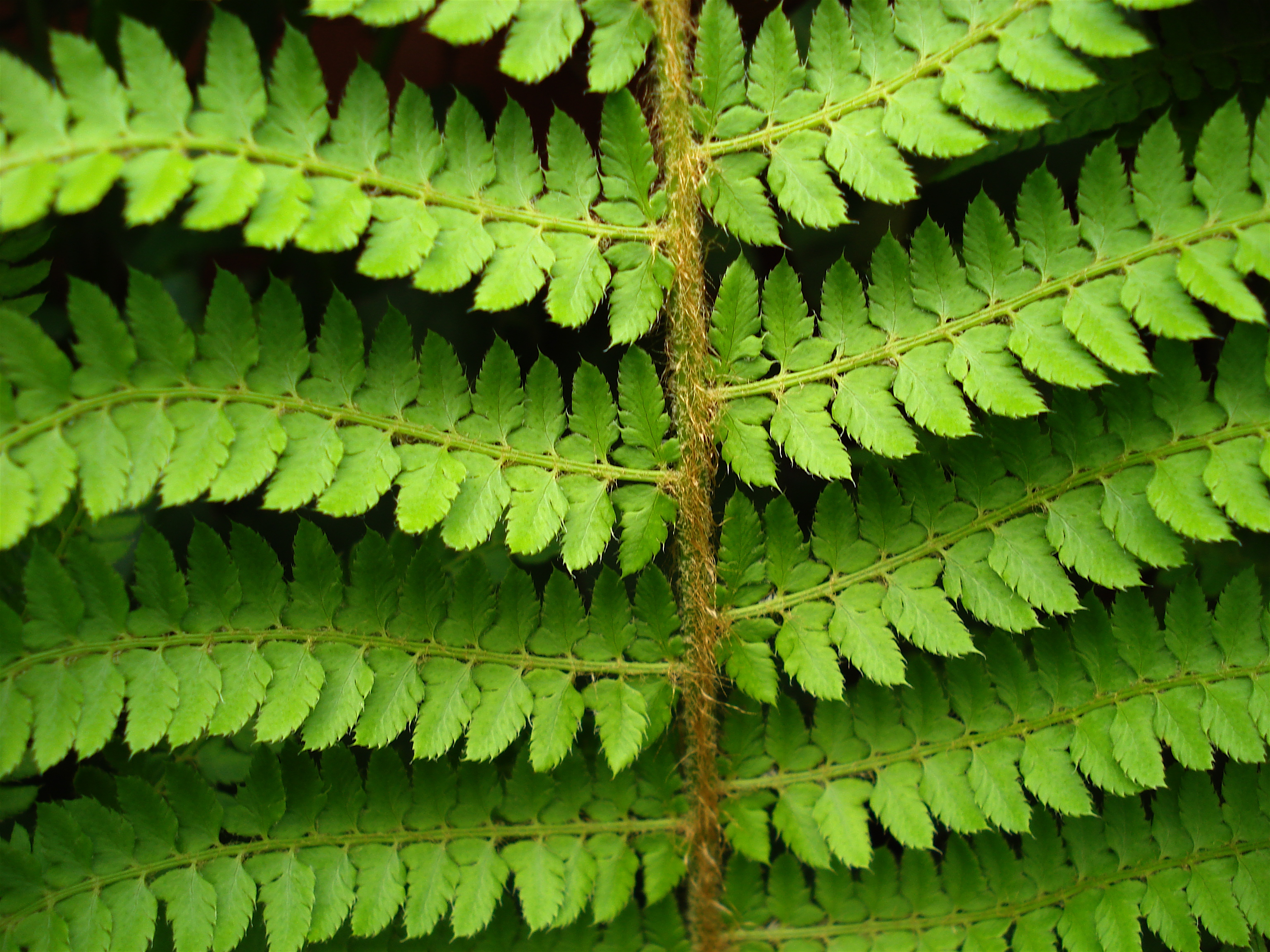
Fern rachis with alternating 'pinnae', rachillae with attached leaflets

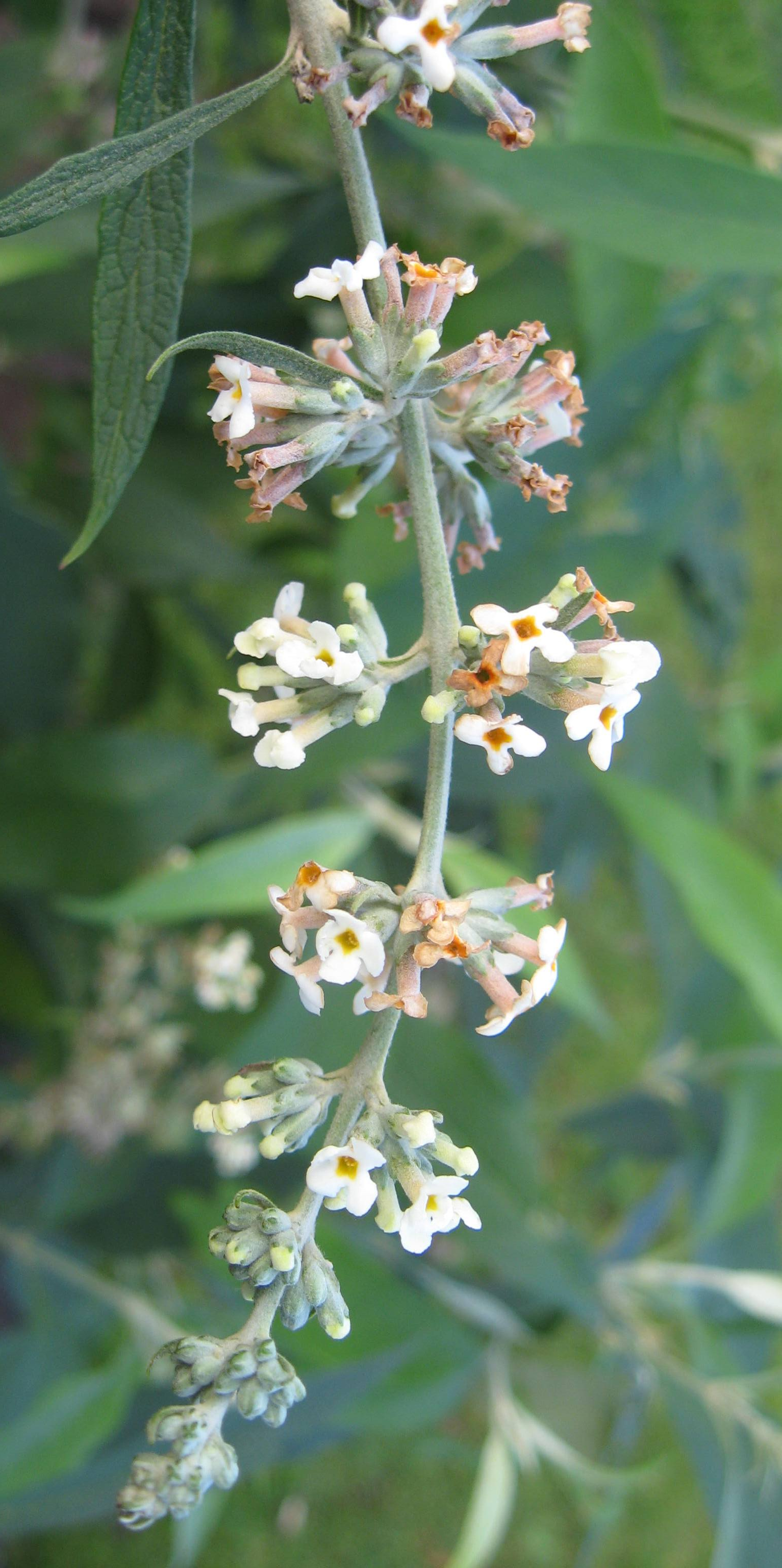
Inflorescence of Buddleja paniculata

== See also ==
- Stipe (botany)
