= Michael Purugganan =

Filipino-American biologist and former journalist

Michael D. Purugganan (born in 1963) is a Filipino-American biologist and former journalist. He is the Silver Professor of Biology and the Dean of the Faculty of Arts and Science of New York University (NYU). Purugganan is also an affiliated faculty member of NYU Abu Dhabi (NYUAD) and the NYU Institute for the Study of the Ancient World (ISAW). He was the former Dean of Science, and the director of the NYU Center for Genomics and Systems Biology in New York (2010-2012) and Abu Dhabi (2012-2017). From 2022 to 2025, he was the director of 19 Washington Square North, the academic space of NYUAD in New York City

Purugganan is a leading authority on plant molecular evolution and genomics. His major work has focused on the study of domestication and evolution of crop species (including Asian and African rice, date palms, barley, Brassica oleracea and maize).

He was a member of the board of trustees of the Alfred P. Sloan Foundation (2013-2025), and served as the U.S. representative to the Council of Scientists of the Human Frontier Science Program (2013-2017) and the Biological Sciences Advisory Committee for the US National Science Foundation (2014-2017). In 2018, he was appointed as co-chair of the Carnegie-Mellon University Presidential Advisory Board on Science, and in 2021 became the first Scientist-In-Residence at the Asian Institute of Management.

== Scientific career ==
Purugganan obtained his undergraduate degree in chemistry in 1985 from the University of the Philippines Diliman. After finishing his undergraduate work he moved to New York City and studied at Columbia University, where he obtained an MA in Chemistry (1986) in the laboratory of Jacqueline Barton. In 1993 he graduated with a Ph.D. in Botany (minor in Global Policy) from the University of Georgia, where he studied at the laboratory of Susan R. Wessler. During his Ph.D. he studied the effects of transposable element "jumping genes" on the evolution of gene structures and showed that regulatory genes evolve quite rapidly at the molecular level.

Upon completion of his Ph.D. he was awarded an Alfred P. Sloan Foundation molecular evolution fellowship at the University of California, San Diego from 1993 to 1995. In 1995, he joined the faculty of North Carolina State University, where in 2005 he was named the William Neal Reynolds Distinguished Professor. He was instrumental in promoting the use of the model plant Arabidopsis thaliana to study evolution, quantitative genetics and ecology, publishing some of the first studies of DNA sequence diversity and the genomic mapping of natural phenotype variation in this species.

In 2006, he joined the faculty of New York University, where he was initially appointed as the Dorothy Schiff Professor of Genomics (2006 - 2017) and in 2016 was named a Julius Silver, Roslyn S. Silver, and Enid Silver Winslow Professor (also known as Silver Professor). His work since joining the NYU faculty has focused on the study of the evolution of domesticated species, particularly rice and date palms, as well as the evolutionary genomics and systems biology of plant environmental adaptation.

As the New York University Dean of Science (2012-2019), Purugganan oversaw an increase in the NYU science faculty by 20%, and the establishment of several new programs, including the Center for Quantum Phenomena, the Laboratory of Molecular Nanoscience, the joint NYU-Max Planck Center for Language, Music and Emotion, and the NYU Chemical Biology Initiative. He also completed the renovation of ~160,000 square feet of research space for science in the NYU downtown Manhattan campus, including the new facilities for the entire Department of Physics, the extensive renovation of neural science and psychology space (including the Center for Brain Imaging, a new computational neuroscience suite, and new space for Social Psychology), and new computational chemistry and nanoscience facilities in the Department of Chemistry. This period also led to close collaborative ties and joint faculty hires between NYU and the New York Genome Center and the Simons Foundation Flatiron Institute. With the establishment of NYU Abu Dhabi and NYU Shanghai, Purugganan helped in faculty hiring, and the planning and development of joint Ph.D. programs and research centers between NYU global campuses.

His tenure as NYU Dean of Science saw a steady increase in the Times Higher Education rankings of NYU in the physical sciences (from 72nd place in 2014 to 41st in 2019) and life sciences (from 54th place in 2015 to 28th place in 2019).

Purugganan has been on the editorial boards of several journals, including Molecular Biology and Evolution, Trends in Plant Science, Annual Review of Ecology, Evolution and Systematics, Molecular Ecology, and Genome Biology and Evolution. Purugganan also serves on the international scientific advisory boards of the Center for Research in Agricultural Genomics in Barcelona, the Philippine Genome Center, the US Compositae Genome Project, the Norwegian Aqua Genome Project, and the Genome Canada Sunflower Project.

He is listed in the miscellaneous crew credits of the award-winning 2008 feature-length film Sita Sings the Blues as a genetic engineer, and served on the Board of Directors of Imagine Science Films. The film Son of Monarchs was partly filmed in his laboratory, and he served as science adviser for the film The Trees. Purugganan has contributed to the book Evolution: The Extended Synthesis (Edited by Massimo Pigliucci and Gerd B. Müller, 2010).

Purugganan led the scientific team that did genetic research on Judean date palms germinated from seeds which were about 2,000 years old.

== Journalism ==
As an undergraduate at the University of the Philippine Diliman in the early 1980s, Purugganan was the features editor for the student newspaper The Philippine Collegian. In the wake of the assassination of Philippine opposition leader Benigno Aquino Jr. in 1983, he helped lead the initial news coverage in the Philippine Collegian documenting the events that eventually led to the downfall of the Ferdinand Marcos dictatorship. After leaving the Collegian, he continued to be active in journalism, working as a news stringer for Time, Newsweek and the Associated Press. Purugganan in 1984 was offered a position as a foreign correspondent for the Associated Press Manila Bureau, but had to decline as he still had to complete his university studies.

He also wrote on politics and economics for various Philippine newsmagazines. In 1984 he was threatened with a libel suit by then Philippine Prime Minister Cesar Virata, a Marcos ally, for publishing a widely circulated interview in the politically influential Mr & Ms Special Edition in which Virata was quoted as saying "Filipinos never had it so good." Said in the middle of a severe economic crisis and widening poverty, Virata and his quote were harshly criticized by numerous opinion makers as an example of the disconnect between the Marcos government and ordinary Filipinos.

Since 2011, he has written occasional essays for The Huffington Post, and The Philippine Star, GMA News Online, and Rappler in the Philippines.

== Honors and awards ==
- Visiting Fellow, All Souls College, University of Oxford (2025)
- Member, National Academy of Sciences (elected 2024)
- Astor Visiting Lecturer, University of Oxford (2024)
- Corresponding Member, National Academy of Science and Technology of the Philippines (elected 2019)
- Fellow, Organization of Economic Cooperation and Development (2019)
- Global Professorial Chair, University of Bath, UK (2017)
- Khalifa International Date Palm Award (2015)
- Kavli Frontiers of Science Fellow (2011)
- Ayala Foundation USA/PhilDev Foundation Excellence in Science and Technology (2011)
- Guggenheim Fellowship (2006–2007)
- Fellow, American Association for the Advancement of Science (elected 2005)
- NC State Alumni Outstanding Faculty Research Award (2003)
- Sigma Xi Prize (2003)
- Alfred Sloan Young Investigator Award (1997–2002)

== Personal life ==
Purugganan is married to Alessandra Pena, a New Yorker with Spanish and Dominican roots who works as a consultant to UN organizations, international NGOs and foundations. They live in Greenwich Village in Manhattan.
