= Shattering (agriculture) =

Dispersal of seeds upon ripening

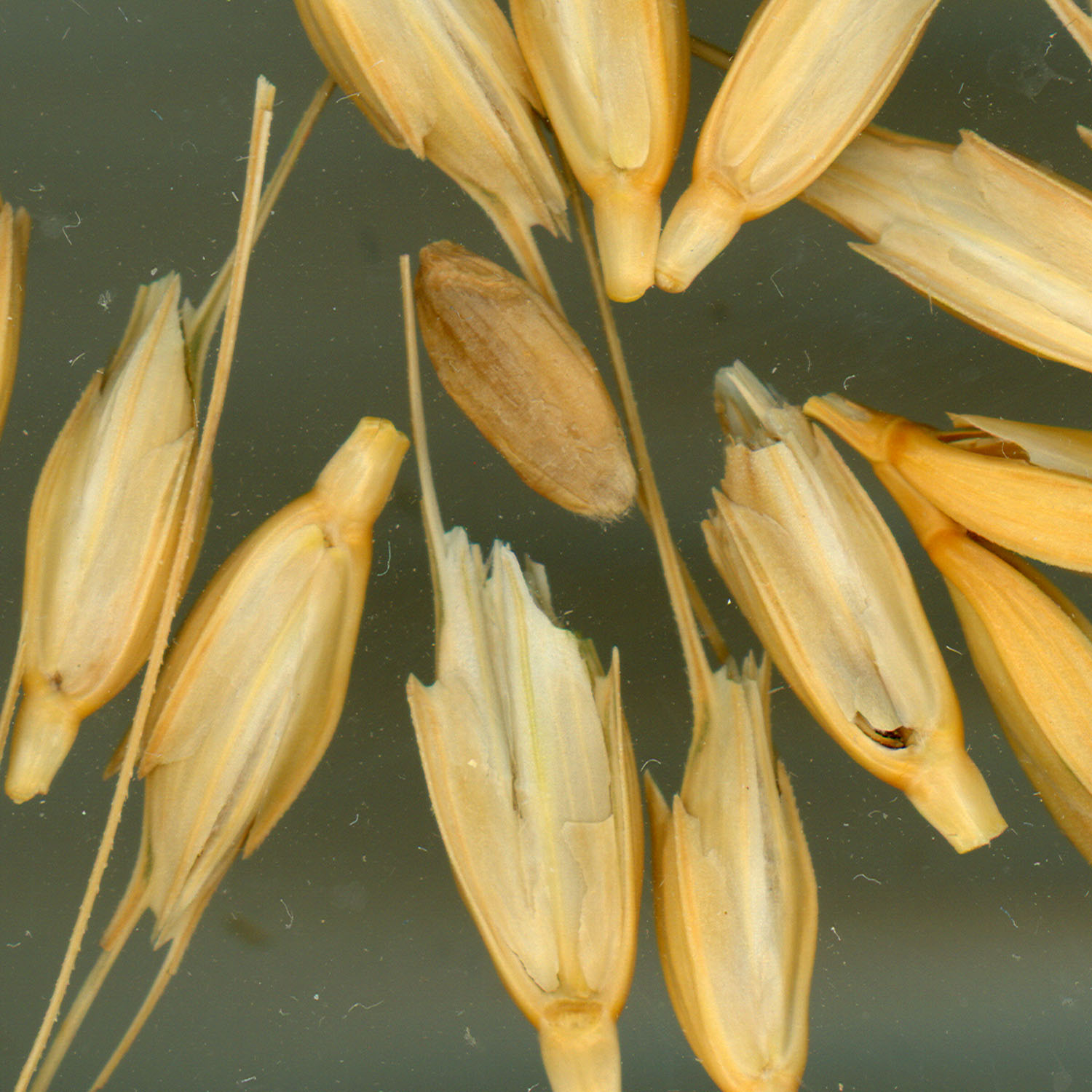
Spikelets of Einkorn wheat, Triticum monococcum

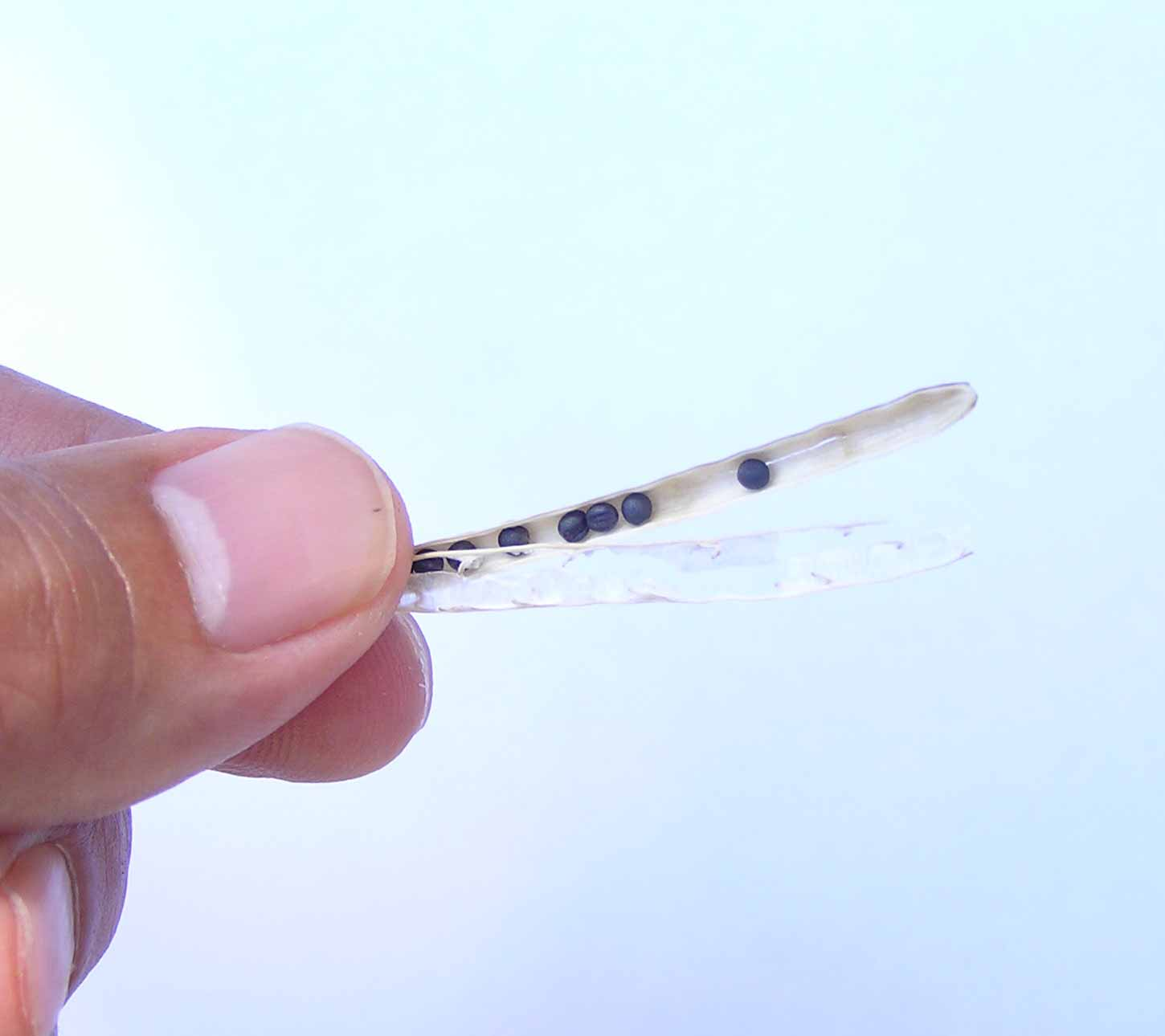
Shattering in many crops involves dehiscence of the mature fruit, for example, in Brassica napus.

In agriculture, shattering is the dispersal of a crop's seeds upon their becoming ripe. From an agricultural perspective this is generally an undesirable process, and in the history of crop domestication several important advances have involved a mutation in a crop plant that reduced shattering; thus, instead of the seeds being dispersed as soon as they were ripe, the mutant plants retained the seeds for longer, which made harvesting much more effective. Non-shattering phenotype is one of the prerequisites for plant breeding especially when introgressing valuable traits from wild varieties of domesticated crops.

A particularly important mutation that was selected very early in the history of agriculture removed the "brittle rachis" problem from wheat. A ripe head ("ear") of wild-type wheat is easily shattered into dispersal units when touched, or blown by the wind, because during ripening a series of abscission layers forms that divides the rachis into short segments, each attached to a single spikelet (which contains 2–3 grains along with chaff).

A different class of shattering mechanisms involves dehiscence of the mature fruit, which releases the seeds.

Rapeseed and the shattering types of sesame are harvested before the seed is fully mature, so that the pods do not split and drop the seeds. Harvesting shattering types of sesame involves wrapping the cut plants before processing.

== Genetics ==
As with all hereditary traits, the genetic basis of shattering is determined through a long process of genetic mapping. Shattering is a quantitative trait, which complicates the process. The result is usually a few genomic regions known as quantitative trait loci; understanding the true molecular nature of this variation will require further analysis of what genes are actually in each locus.

Shattering is heavily studied in the grass family Poaceae, which includes the cereal crops. However, even within this group, there is no single genetic pathway that causes shattering (or the lack thereof): at least the wheat-shattering genes Br1 and Br2 (short for "brittle rachis 1/2") have no obvious ortholog in maize, rice, and sorghum. (Barley has a similar system, however.)

The non-shattering phenotype in sorghum (Sorghum bicolor) is due to loss of function in the YABBY-family Sh1 gene, a change that has independently occurred three times. A similar mutation may play a role in the domestication of maize and rice as the orthologs in the two species are found in shattering-related QTLs.

Shattering is similarly a key domestication trait in many legumes (Fabaceae; Rosid; Eudicot), but still to this day a lot of yield is lost to shattering. Most species have several shattering-resistant mutations, each providing only partial resistance. By breeding plants with different shattering-resistant mutations together one can hope to obtain plants with even lower tendency to shatter.

Shattering genetics is perhaps best understood in the model plant Arabidopsis thaliana, which has its silique shatter like many other plants of the Brassicaceae do. This knowledge is being transferred to crops of the same family such as rapeseed.

== Research ==
Current research priorities to understand the genetics of shattering include the following crops:

- Monocot - Poaceae - Barley
- Eudicots -
  - Caryophyllales
    - Polygonaceae - Buckwheat
    - Amaranthaceae - Amaranth grain
  - Rosid - Brassicales - Brassicaceae - Oilseed rape (Brassica napus)
