= Vanessa Woods =

Australian science writer

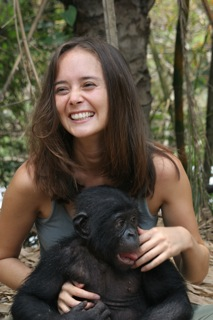
- Vanessa Woods with a bonobo at Lola ya Bonobo Sanctuary in DRC.
- Born: 1977 (age 48–49)
- Citizenship: Australia, United States
- Education: Australian National University
- Occupations: Scientist; Author; Journalist
- Spouse: Brian Hare

Vanessa Woods (born 1977) is an Australian science writer, author and journalist, and is the main Australian/New Zealand feature writer for the Discovery Channel. A graduate of the Australian National University with a Master's degree in Science Communication, and an author of children's books, she is best known for her work in both the Republic of the Congo and the Democratic Republic of the Congo comparing the different cooperative behaviors of bonobos and common chimpanzees. Her mother is of Chinese descent. She is the author of Bonobo Handshake: A Memoir of Love and Adventure in the Congo and It's Every Monkey for Themselves: A True Story of Sex, Love, and Lies in the Jungle.

== Career ==
Working with colleagues from the Max Planck Institute for Evolutionary Anthropology in Leipzig, Germany, she spent 10 months in the Democratic Republic of Congo studying bonobos, a species of great ape as genetically close to humans as the Common Chimpanzee, in order to make comparisons between the behaviors of humankind and ape.

She wrote an in-depth report on killer bees encountered during her studies in Costa Rica, and has also written a piece on the yearly cherry blossom experience in Kyoto, Japan.

== Partial bibliography ==
- It's Every Monkey for Themselves – (2007) Allen & Unwin, ISBN 978-1-74114-859-6
- Bonobo Handshake – (2010) Penguin USA/Gotham Books, ISBN 978-1-59240-546-6
- Brian Hare and Vanessa Woods, "Survival of the Friendliest: Natural selection for hypersocial traits enabled Earth's apex species to best Neandertals and other competitors", Scientific American, vol. 323, no. 2 (August 2020), pp. 58–63.
- Brian Hare and Vanessa Woods, "Survival of the Friendliest. Understanding Our Origins and Rediscovering Our Common Humanity". New York: Random House 2020. ISBN 978-0-39959-068-9

=== Children's books ===
- It's True! There Are Bugs in Your Bed (2004) ISBN 1-74114-299-7
- It's True! Space turns you into spaghetti (2006) ISBN 1-74114-625-9
- It's True! Pirates ate rats (2007) ISBN 1-74114-607-0

== Awards and recognition ==
In 2003, Woods won the Australasian Science Award for journalism. In 2007, her children's book on space, It's True! Space turns you into spaghetti, was named an Acclaimed Book by the UK Royal Society and shortlisted for the Royal Society's Junior Science Book Prize.
