= Brian Hare =

American anthropologist (born 1976)

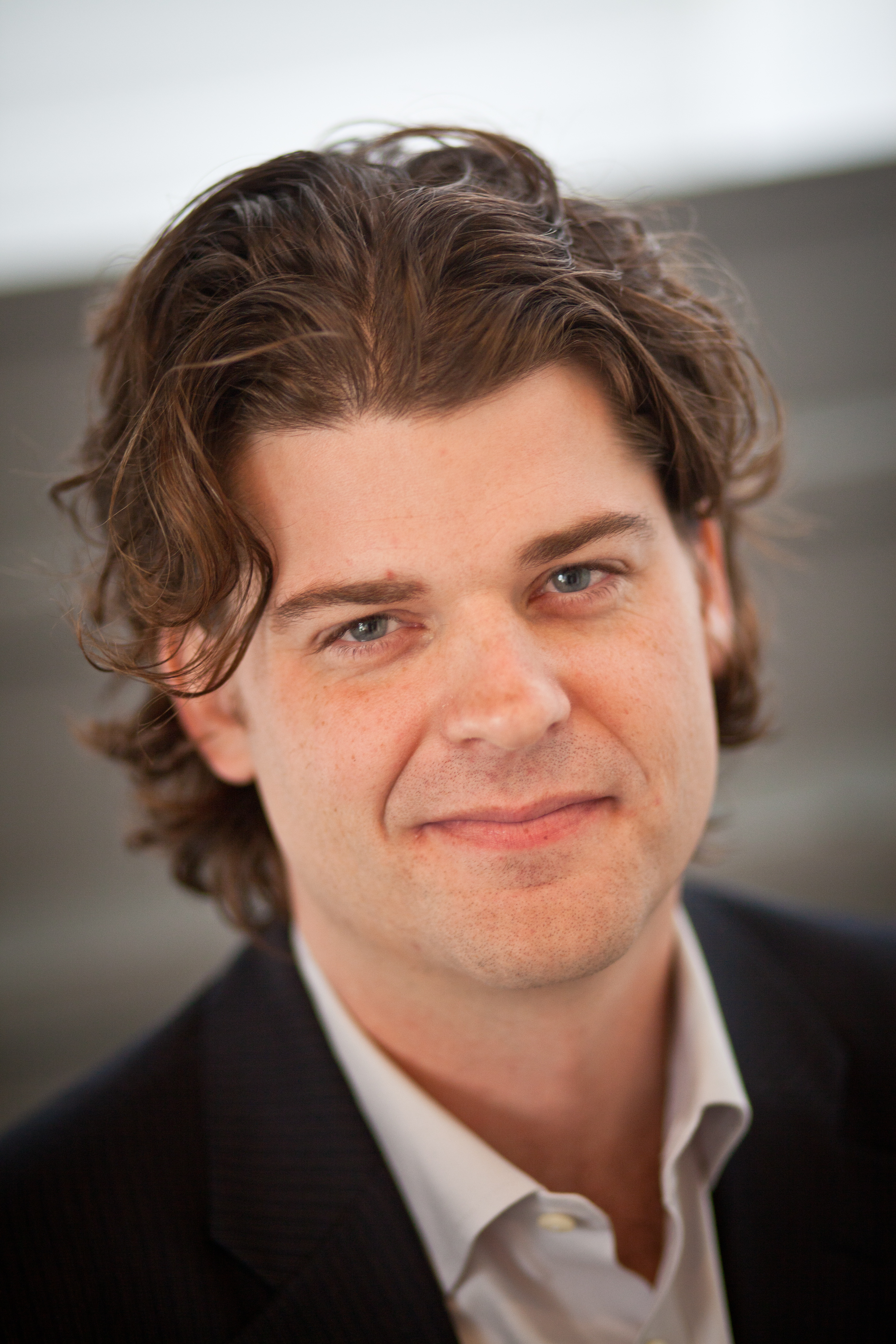
- Hare in 2010
- Born: February 20, 1976 (age 50)
- Citizenship: United States
- Education: Harvard University (Ph.D); Emory University (B.A.)
- Spouse: Vanessa Woods
- Scientific career
- Fields: Anthropology, Psychology
- Workplaces: Duke University
- Doctoral advisor: Richard Wrangham

Brian Hare (born 1976) is a professor of evolutionary anthropology at Duke University. He researches the evolution of cognition by studying both humans, our close relatives the primates (especially bonobos and chimpanzees), and species whose cognition converged with our own (primarily domestic dogs). He founded and co-directs the Duke Canine Cognition Center.

== Biography ==
Hare obtained his Bachelor of Arts degree in Anthropology and Psychology from Emory University in 1998. As an undergraduate, he conducted research with Michael Tomasello, where he found that chimpanzees are sensitive to what other chimpanzees can and cannot see, and that domestic dogs can follow humans’ pointing gestures to find food.

Hare continued his study of primate and canid cognition at Harvard University, where he was advised by Richard Wrangham. In 2004, he obtained his Ph.D in Biological Anthropology. He joined the Max Planck Institute for Evolutionary Anthropology in Leipzig, Germany, where he founded the Hominoid Psychology Research Group. He studied great ape cognition in several African sanctuaries, including bonobos at Lola ya Bonobo and chimpanzees at Tchimpounga and Ngamba Island.

Since 2008, Hare has been a professor at Duke University. In 2009, he founded the Duke Canine Cognition Center, which has tested the cognitive abilities of pet dogs in the Research Triangle area as well as working dogs from organizations such as Canine Companions for Independence. He has also researched lemur cognition at the Duke Lemur Center.

Hare co-founded Dognition, a citizen science enterprise where dog owners play a variety of games with their dogs to test the dogs’ cognitive skills. With his wife, Vanessa Woods, Hare co-authored the popular science book The Genius of Dogs, which was a New York Times Best Seller.

== Books ==
- Brian Hare and Vanessa Woods, Survival of the Friendliest: Understanding Our Origins and Rediscovering Our Common Humanity. New York: Random House 2020. ISBN 978-0-39959-068-9

== Publications ==
- Brian Hare and Vanessa Woods, "Survival of the Friendliest: Natural selection for hypersocial traits enabled Earth's apex species to best Neandertals and other competitors", Scientific American, vol. 323, no. 2 (August 2020), pp. 58–63.

== Honors and awards ==
Hare was a 2004 recipient of the Sofia Kovalevskaya Award.
