= Heritability of IQ =

Relationship of IQ scores to genetic variation

Research on the heritability of intelligence quotient (IQ) inquires into the degree of variation in IQ within a population that is associated with genetic variation between individuals in that population. There has been significant controversy in the academic community about the heritability of IQ since research on the issue began in the late nineteenth century. Intelligence in the normal range is a polygenic trait, meaning that it is influenced by more than one gene, and in the case of intelligence at least 500 genes. Further, explaining the similarity in IQ of closely related persons requires careful study because environmental factors may be correlated with genetic factors. Outside the normal range, certain single gene genetic disorders, such as phenylketonuria, can negatively affect intelligence.

Estimates in the academic research of the heritability of IQ vary significantly by study and by study design. The general figure for heritability of IQ from behavioral genetic studies is about 0.5 across multiple studies in varying populations. The relationship between heritability and age is uncertain, though most researchers believe that there is an increase in heritability over the course of the lifespan and that this increase reflects the importance of gene-environment correlations. Recent genetic research has come to more equivocal results, with estimates of heritability lower than those derived from twin studies, causing what is known as the "missing heritability problem".

Although IQ differences between individuals have been shown to have a hereditary component, it does not follow that disparities in IQ between groups have a genetic basis. The scientific consensus is that genetics does not explain average differences in IQ test performance between racial groups.

== Heritability and caveats ==
Heritability is a statistic used in the fields of breeding and genetics that estimates the degree of variation in a phenotypic trait in a population is explained by genetic variation between individuals in that population. The concept of heritability can be expressed in the form of the following question: "What is the proportion of the variation in a given trait within a population that is not explained by the environment or random chance?"

Estimates of heritability take values ranging from 0 to 1; a heritability estimate of 1 indicates that all variation in the trait in question is genetic and a heritability estimate of 0 indicates that none of the variation is genetic.

There are a number of caveats to consider when interpreting heritability:

- Heritability measures the proportion of variation in a trait that can be attributed to genes, and not the proportion of a trait caused by genes. Thus, if the environment relevant to a given trait changes in a way that affects all members of the population equally, the mean value of the trait will change without any change in its heritability (because the variation or differences among individuals in the population will stay the same). This has evidently happened for height: the heritability of stature is high, but average heights continue to increase. Thus, even in developed nations, a high heritability of a trait does not necessarily mean that average group differences are due to genes. Some have gone further, and used height as an example in order to argue that "even highly heritable traits can be strongly manipulated by the environment, so heritability has little if anything to do with controllability."
- A common error is to assume that a heritability figure is necessarily unchangeable. The value of heritability can change if the impact of environment (or of genes) in the population is substantially altered. If the environmental variation encountered by different individuals increases, then the heritability figure would decrease. On the other hand, if everyone had the same environment, then heritability would be 100%. The population in developing nations often has more diverse environments than in developed nations. This would mean that heritability figures would be lower in developing nations. Another example is phenylketonuria which previously caused intellectual disabilities in everyone who had this genetic disorder and thus had a heritability of 100%. Today, this can be prevented by following a modified diet, resulting in a lowered heritability.
- A high heritability of a trait does not mean that effects such as learning are not involved. Vocabulary size, for example, is substantially heritable (and highly correlated with general intelligence) although every word in an individual's vocabulary is learned. In a society in which plenty of words are available in everyone's environment, especially for individuals who are motivated to seek them out, the number of words that individuals actually learn depends to a considerable extent on their genetic predispositions and thus heritability is high.
- Contrary to popular belief, two parents of higher IQ will not necessarily produce offspring of equal or higher intelligence. Polygenic traits often appear less heritable at the extremes. A heritable trait is definitionally more likely to appear in the offspring of two parents high in that trait than in the offspring of two randomly selected parents. However, the more extreme the expression of the trait in the parents, the less likely the child is to display the same extreme as the parents. In fact, parents whose IQ is at either extreme are more likely to produce offspring with IQ closer to the mean (or average) than they are to produce offspring with high IQ. At the same time, the more extreme the expression of the trait in the parents, the more likely the child is to express the trait at all. For example, the child of two extremely tall parents is likely to be taller than the average person (displaying the trait), but unlikely to be taller than the two parents (displaying the trait at the same extreme). See also regression toward the mean.

== Methodology ==
There are multiple types of studies that are designed to estimate heritability and other variance components, stemming from the field of biometrical genetics. The variance, or more simply the differences in a trait within a population, can be partitioned into specific variance components that are based on particular decomposition models for the phenotype. First pointed out by Ronald Fisher and Sewall Wright, different sources of variance differ in their contribution to the resemblance between types of relatives.By making certain assumptions about the relationship between genes and environment, the field of quantitative genetics has developed equations that describe the expected correlation between relatives in terms of specific variance components (shared environment, additive genetic, etc.).

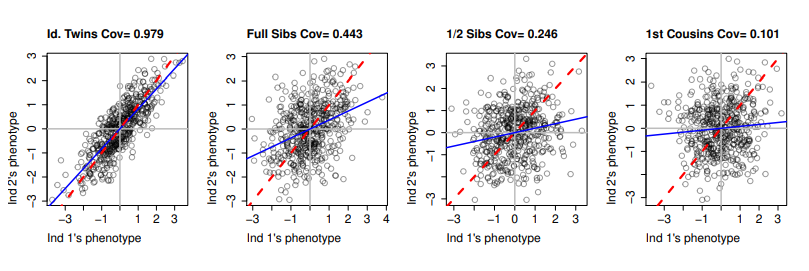
Correlation between relatives on a purely additive genetic model of phenotypic determination, from Coop 2020

One simple case is presented by twin studies. By making assumptions about genetic additivity and sources of environmental variation, researchers can estimate the heritability of a phenotype by comparing the resemblance of twins. Another method used to estimate heritability is adoption studies. Because adoptive parents and their adoptive children share a common environment, but not genetics, researchers in behavioral genetics have used data from adoptive families to estimate the heritability of IQ. Based on quantitative genetic theory, some researchers have taken a broader approach to analyzing familial resemblance. These researchers typically use path analysis (Note: For the full series of papers developing the method, see) to fit models using larger sets of familiar correlations, incorporating cultural transmission, adoption, other complex living arrangements, and generalized assortative mating. However, with the transition into the postgenomic era, issues with controversial assumptions in previous models analyzing familial resemblance may be superseded by genetic analysis. Methods have developed in genetic analysis to estimate the total heritability of a trait using large datasets with millions of genetic variants.

In the case of IQ, heritability estimates based on direct observation of molecular genetics have been significantly lower (around 10%) than those employing traditional methods (40–80%). This discrepancy has been termed the "missing heritability problem." While researchers such as Robert Plomin and Sophie von Stumm contend that this gap will likely disappear with the acquisition of more genetic data, Eric Turkheimer and Lucas J. Matthews argue that it reveals a deeper set of methodological problem inherent in the concept of heritability itself, which will not be easy to overcome.

== Estimates ==
Although individual family studies that estimate the heritability of IQ vary greatly, (Note: For example, individual studies have estimated values as low as "not significantly different from zero" to as high as over .8.) most family studies estimate the heritability of IQ in the range from 0.4 to 0.8 and reviews of the literature typically summarize classical family design research with an estimate of 0.5. Issues with the methodology of family studies have long plagued the research field, but some researchers now believe that genome-wide association studies can provide less biased estimates of heritability. These genomic studies provide estimates of heritability that are much lower than those derived from twin studies, leading to what is denoted as the "missing heritability problem". The latest results from genomic methods are between 0.10 to 0.20, and researchers have proposed various theories to explain the gap.

=== Twin and family research ===
==== Twin studies ====
Twin studies are the most common method used to estimate the heritability of most traits. Because monozygotic twins derive from one fertilized egg, they are largely genetically identical, (Note: Strictly speaking, monozygotic twins are not purely genetically identical due to somatic mosaicism and mutations.) while dizygotic twins are expected to share 50% of their DNA. Twin studies compare the resemblance of monozygotic twins to the resemblance of dizygotic twins to estimate the heritability of a trait using various models.

Twin studies have shown greater resemblance between monozygotic twins than dizygotic twins. This has led most researchers in behavioral genetics to conclude that the heritability of IQ is in a range between 0.4 to 0.8. However, it is not clear if all of the assumptions in twin studies hold true. Critics often focus on the equal environment assumption, which is the assumption that environmentally caused similarity is the same for both monozygotic and dizygotic twins. Genetic modeling has found that even in the complete absence of genetic factors for a trait, environmental similarity between monozygotic twins will cause heritability estimators to produce large estimates of genetic heritability. Researchers have produced different analyses of the equal environment assumption, some suggesting that the assumption is untenable for related traits like educational attainment.

Twins reared apart have also been the subject of significant debate. The 2006 edition of Assessing adolescent and adult intelligence by Alan S. Kaufman and Elizabeth O. Lichtenberger reports correlations of 0.86 for identical twins raised together compared to 0.76 for those raised apart and 0.47 for siblings. Theoretically, the correlation between twins reared apart is a direct estimate of heritability, as the only common factor between the twins would be the genetic variance. However, this makes an assumption of uncorrelated environments between twins, which may not be the case. For example, some researchers argue that twins experience similar education and this causes increased similarity in IQ. Thomas Bouchard argues that some previous analyses of the data on twins reared apart are an abuse of statistical theory that he calls "pseudoanalysis".

==== Adoption studies ====
Another study design researchers have used is adoption studies. In theory, "adoption creates sets of genetically related individuals who do not share a common family environment because they were adopted apart". Adoption studies have broadly found that the IQs of adoptees are more similar to their biological parents than that of their adoptive parents, in tandem with findings that adoption into better socioeconomic environments greatly increases IQ. For example, one analysis of the Texas Adoption Project estimated heritability at 0.78. However, one recent adoption study estimate heritability for cognitive ability at 0.33. Some critics point to assortative mating, range restriction and other complex family and social processes as providing issues in the interpretation of data from adoption studies. Recent studies employing polygenic scores for educational attainment in adoptees have found a more complicated interaction between genes and environments.

==== Other models ====
More broadly, researchers have analyzed the resemblance between various familial classes, such as parent-child correlations. In 1982, Bouchard and McGue reviewed such correlations reported in 111 original studies in the United States. The mean correlation of IQ scores between monozygotic twins was 0.86, between siblings 0.47, between half-siblings 0.31, and between cousins 0.15. Some more basic model fitting studies are found in the behavioral genetics literature. Loehlin fit a model to the Bouchard and McGue data which estimated broad heritability at .58 from 'direct' methods and .47 from 'indirect' methods. Chipuer et al. analyzed this data using a LISREL model and estimated broad sense heritability as .51. Other models successively add more components. In 1997, Devlin et al. also used these correlations to fit and compare different models and estimated that heritability was less than 50% in their best fitting models, finding that maternal effects were particularly important in their analysis. Bouchard and McGue reviewed the literature in 2003, arguing that Devlin's conclusions about the magnitude of heritability is not substantially different from previous reports and that their conclusions regarding prenatal effects stands in contradiction to many previous reports.

Genetics researchers observed that cultural heritability and genetic heritability can produce similar patterns of observations between relatives in the 1970s. As a result, in a series of papers using models based on path analysis, a group of researchers from the University of Hawaii analyzed data collected on American families and estimated genetic heritability ranging from 0.30 to 0.34. A later study by Otto et al. applied the path analysis method to the data collected by Bouchard and McGue and estimated heritability ranging from 0.29 to 0.42. Path analysis models have been subject to criticism for further issues with modeling assumptions and statistical procedures, reflecting broader criticisms of structural equation modeling.

=== Molecular genetics ===
These findings are compatible with the view that a large number of genes, each with only a small effect, contribute to differences in intelligence.

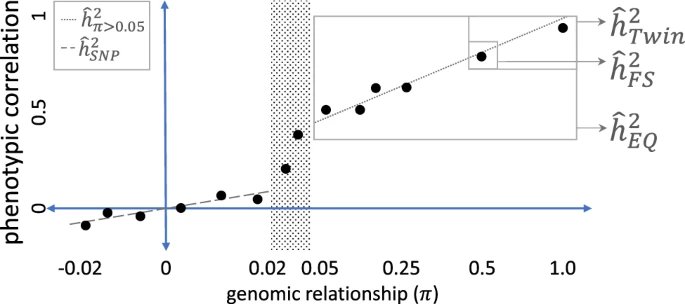
A diagram showing the relationship between genomic relatedness and phenotypic correlation for a hypothetical trait, a method used to estimate heritability. From Kemper et al. 2021

Molecular genetic studies have been central to several major scientific advances relevant to heritability. The first is the advent of polygenic scores, which take the thousands of single-nucleotide polymorphisms (SNPs) that influence a given trait to form an estimated "genetic value" or "genetic propensity". Most genome-wide association studies (GWAS) estimate a polygenic score (PGS) and describe its overall statistical contribution to variance for the population in question, i.e. providing a R^{2} (coefficient of determination) for the polygenic score. This measures only the predictive power of the genetic variants in the study in question, a future study with larger sample size or more genetic variants tagged may produce a larger amount. Consequently, a given polygenic score only captures "a fraction of SNP-heritability". The second is the concept of SNP heritability, which is the total proportion of phenotypic variance explained by SNPs.

Genomic studies have found significant correlations between IQ and various polygenic scores, but the true size of this association is unclear. The largest published analysis for genetic contributions to IQ found that the polygenic score could explain 9.9% of the variance between families, while some later analyses estimated that polygenic scores can predict about 11% of the variance. However, these analyses rely on differences in genetic variants between families which introduce biases from population stratification, assortative mating, and indirect genetic effects such as dynastic effects or genetic nurture. One study found that polygenic score prediction for cognitive traits was 60% greater between families than within families.

Genomic studies have also estimated values of SNP heritability for IQ. Very early studies used a method called genome-wide complex trait analysis (GCTA) which calculates the overall genetic similarity (as indexed by the cumulative effects of all genotyped single nucleotide polymorphisms) between all pairs of individuals in a sample of unrelated individuals and then correlates this genetic similarity with phenotypic similarity across all the pairs. Studies using this method reported relatively large estimates of heritability, ranging from 40% to 51%. A later study by the same group estimated SNP heritability for different measures of cognitive ability at about 31%. However, researchers later discovered population stratification and other environmental biases were major issues affecting basic analyses. As a result, recent research has sought to estimate the SNP heritability of traits, including IQ, using within-family genome-wide association studies, though researchers have identified that these are not immune to interpretive issues. Some estimates of the SNP heritability of IQ, derived from genome-wide association studies (GWAS), put the figure much lower, at around 10%. For example, one recent published analysis estimated the within-family SNP heritability of cognitive function to be 14%. A more recent unpublished preprint estimated the SNP heritability at about 19%.

Another set of methods attempts to generalize correlations between familial resemblance and genetic resemblance to estimate heritability. These methods are free from most environmental biases and have typically found that twin estimates of heritability are inflated. When tested on similar achievement phenotypes like educational attainment, these methods find that twin methods significantly inflate the value of heritability.

The phrase 'missing heritability' is commonly used to describe both the gap between classically derived heritability estimates and the variance explained by variants and "SNP" heritability. As the heritability estimates obtained by molecular genetic studies do not match earlier research from twin and family studies, researchers have proposed many theories as to explain these discrepancies for various traits, including but not limited (Note: Some other proposed explanations that have largely been discounted include gene-gene interactions like epistasis and epigenetics,) to rare variants, untagged variants, gene-environment interactions or environmental confounding. Some researchers believe that the gap for IQ heritability will be narrowed with larger, better-powered genome-wide studies and with whole-genome sequencing, while others indicate that the gap may at least in part reflect overestimation of heritability by twin studies.

== Environmental effects ==
=== Shared environment ===
In biometrical studies that partition variance, "shared environment" refers to hypothetical factors that increase the similarity of relatives in a particular study design. Researchers draw a distinction between "objectively shared environments" (features of the environment that relatives such as siblings share) and the "shared environment" in behavioral genetics studies, which measures only the factors that increase homogeneity.

Researchers typically use the same designs to estimate shared environment effects as to estimate heritability: twin studies, adoption studies and family studies. These methods often come to disparate conclusions about the effects of shared environment.

Some adoption studies show that by adulthood adoptive siblings aren't more similar in IQ than strangers, while adult full siblings show an IQ correlation of 0.24. These findings have led researchers such as Sandra Scarr and Robert Plomin to conclude that shared environment has minimal effect on intelligence in adulthood. Psychologists Ken Richardson and Sarah Norgate question the assumptions of adoption studies for IQ, highlighting issues with assumptions of additivity and randomization. However, adoption studies have also shown that the process of adoption has a positive effect on IQ scores, and two studies have associated this with factors such as the level of parental education and socioeconomic status of adoptive parents. In a 1991 paper, psychologist Eric Turkheimer tried to reconcile results from adoption studies that demonstrate large increases in IQ from adoption and those that show low correlations between non-biologically related relatives. He argued that early adoption studies first established that genetic effects influence behavioral phenotypes, while later studies from Schiff and colleagues demonstrate that environment has an influence. Researchers Alexandra Burt and Wendy Johnson argue that the joint study of means and variance is necessary to understand the impact of environment. In a 2024 study, Burt et al. propose that measurement error or noise might inhibit the identification of specific environmental factors that influence academic achievement.

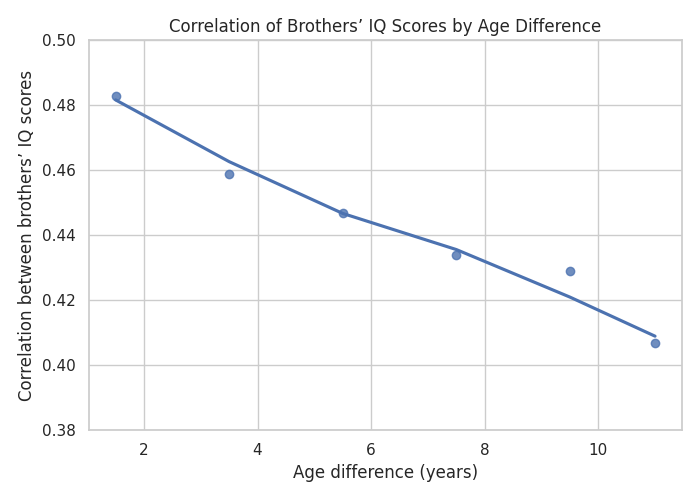
Relationship between correlation between brothers' IQ scores and age differences in Sundet et al. 2008

Some studies of twins reared apart (e.g. Bouchard, 1990) find a significant shared environmental influence, of at least 10% going into late adulthood. Jack Kaplan suggests that the evidence from twin studies and adoption studies are inconsistent, and that twin studies suggest a role for the effect of shared environment on intelligence in adulthood. Researchers such as Briley and Tucker-Drob have suggested that low shared environmental estimates in adulthood may arise because individuals differentially respond to objectively shared environments over time, as a result of unmodelled interactions with either genetic or objectively nonshared environmental factors. One unpublished meta-analysis of twin studies finds estimates of shared environment around 20% for 15-20 year olds, but results for adults no greater than 15%. Researchers have proposed many different factors that could influence intelligence through the shared environment component. One 2018 paper by Laura Engelhardt and colleagues found that measures of socioeconomic status, school demographics and neighborhood socioeconomic status statistically account for most of shared environmental influences on several metrics of intelligence.

Another method researchers have used to estimate the shared environmental component for intelligence is studies of siblings. In a large study, Kendler and colleagues used twins, step-siblings, and half-siblings to estimate the shared environment component of many behavioral phenotypes. They found shared environment components for IQ ranging from about 10% to 20%, depending on the relationship class. Another study found an association between similarity in age between siblings and similarity in IQ scores, suggesting familial environment influences on intelligence scores.

A 2015 study by Johnathan Daw and colleagues argues that the additivity assumption of typical family studies is not correct and that measures of objectively measured shared environment could moderate the estimated nonshared environment component. They found that shared environments such as birth order, household size, sibling age dispersion, and school quality exhibit "large moderating effects on both verbal intelligence and academic achievement". They suggested that these results show how objectively shared environments can influence intelligence in contrast to a common belief that objectively shared environments do not influence children's lives.

=== Non-shared environment ===
As nonshared environmental variance is simply the leftover variance not accounted for by genetic variance and shared environmental variance, it encompasses any factors that cause differences between siblings and estimates vary based on the estimates of heritability and shared environment. Robert McCall argues nonshared environment contributes 15–25% of the variance of IQ scores. Although parents treat their children differently, known measures of differential treatment explains only a small amount of non-shared environmental influence. One suggestion is that children react differently to the same environmental factors: that objectively shared measures of the environment can have different effects on siblings. One 1994 study of the National Longitudinal Survey of Youth found that a measure of the home environment accounted for nonshared environmental variance for several measures of intelligence, while Daw et al. suggest that nonshared environment is moderated by objectively shared environment. More likely influences may be the impact of peers and other experiences outside the family. For example, siblings grown up in the same household may have different friends and teachers and even contract different illnesses. This factor may be one of the reasons why IQ score correlations between siblings decreases as they get older.

Some authors highlight measurement error as one source of variance attributed to the nonshared environment, as measurement error is captured in the nonshared environment term. Another factor that produces differences between individuals is stochastic variation, often attributed to nonlinear epigenetic processes.

=== Dickens and Flynn model ===
Dickens and Flynn (2001) argued that the "heritability" figure includes both a direct effect of the genotype on IQ and also indirect effects where the genotype changes the environment, in turn affecting IQ. That is, those with a higher IQ tend to seek out stimulating environments that further increase IQ. The direct effect can initially have been very small but feedback loops can create large differences in IQ. In their model an environmental stimulus can have a very large effect on IQ, even in adults, but this effect also decays over time unless the stimulus continues. This model could be adapted to include possible factors, like nutrition in early childhood, that may cause permanent effects.

The Flynn effect is the increase in average intelligence test scores by about 0.3% annually, resulting in the average person today scoring 15 points higher in IQ compared to the generation 50 years ago. This effect can be explained by a generally more stimulating environment for all people. Some scientists have suggested that such enhancements are due to better nutrition, better parenting and schooling, as well as exclusion of the least intelligent people from reproduction. However, Flynn and a group of other scientists share the viewpoint that modern life implies solving many abstract problems which leads to a rise in their IQ scores.

=== Indirect genetic effects ===
Various molecular genetic studies have identified an effect of alleles not carried by an individual, but some relative, on their phenotype. These have been varyingly referred to as "dynastic effects", "non-transmitted coefficients", "interpersonal genetic effects", "genetic nurture", or more broadly as "indirect genetic effects".

Kong reports that, "Nurture has a genetic component, i.e. alleles in the parents affect the parents' phenotypes and through that influence the outcomes of the child." These results were obtained through a meta-analysis of educational attainment and polygenic scores of non-transmitted alleles. Although the study deals with educational attainment and not IQ, these two are strongly linked.

== Influences ==
=== Heritability and socioeconomic status ===
Hypotheses about the relationship between the value of heritability and socioeconomic status originated with Sandra Scarr's 1971 article Race, Social Class, and IQ. Scarr notes that existing theories of environmental disadvantage explaining the relationship between social class and IQ predict that more advantaged groups will show greater genetic variance as the advantaged groups don't experience as many detrimental environmental effects. In her study, she identified statistical interactions between socioeconomic environment and genetic variance, finding that genetic influences on IQ were stronger in higher socioeconomic groups where environmental conditions allowed genetic potential to be more fully expressed, whereas in lower socioeconomic groups, adverse environments constrained this expression and reduced the impact of genetic differences. Other than some minor criticisms and a partial replication, the topic was not broached again until the 1996 APA report "Intelligence: Knowns and Unknowns", which stated that:

"We should note, however, that low-income and non-white families are poorly represented in existing adoption studies as well as in most twin samples. Thus it is not yet clear whether these studies apply to the population as a whole. It remains possible that, across the full range of income and ethnicity, between-family differences have more lasting consequences for psychometric intelligence."

Relationship between the genetic variance component and socioeconomic status in Turkheimer et al. 2003

A 1999 study by David Rowe and colleagues replicated the effect in the National Longitudinal Study of Adolescent Health, finding that among children from poorly-educated parents 'shared environment' was associated with most of the variance, while among children from well-educated parents, genes were associated with most of the variance. Turkheimer and colleagues (2003) argued that the proportions of IQ variance attributable to genes and environment vary with socioeconomic status. They found that in a study on seven-year-old twins, in impoverished families, 60% of the variance in early childhood IQ was accounted for by the shared family environment, and the contribution of genes is close to zero; in affluent families, the result is almost exactly the reverse. The name "Scarr-Rowe effect" was proposed for this proposed interaction between heritability and socioeconomic status by Eric Turkheimer in 2009 paper presentation. Later studies found more equivocal results, some failing to replicate the finding in different locations. A 2016 meta-analysis found that the effects varied by country, with moderate interactions in studies from the United States, while the effects were zero or reversed in studies from Australia and Western Europe. A large study published the following year, however, found negligible impacts using data from twins in Florida.

Recent research has focused on the relationship between socioeconomic status and heritability using genomic data. One 2020 study on educational attainment, a closely related but not identical phenotype, found that polygenic scores had greater predictive value in lower socioeconomic status quartiles. A 2021 study similarly found an increase in SNP heritability with increasing socioeconomic deprivation; lower socioeconomic status was associated with higher heritability. One 2024 study used polygenic indices and found that the Scarr-Rowe hypothesis "lacks empirical support" and suggested an alternative theory, the compensatory advantage hypothesis, that heritability was lower among populations with higher heritability.

=== Heritability and age ===
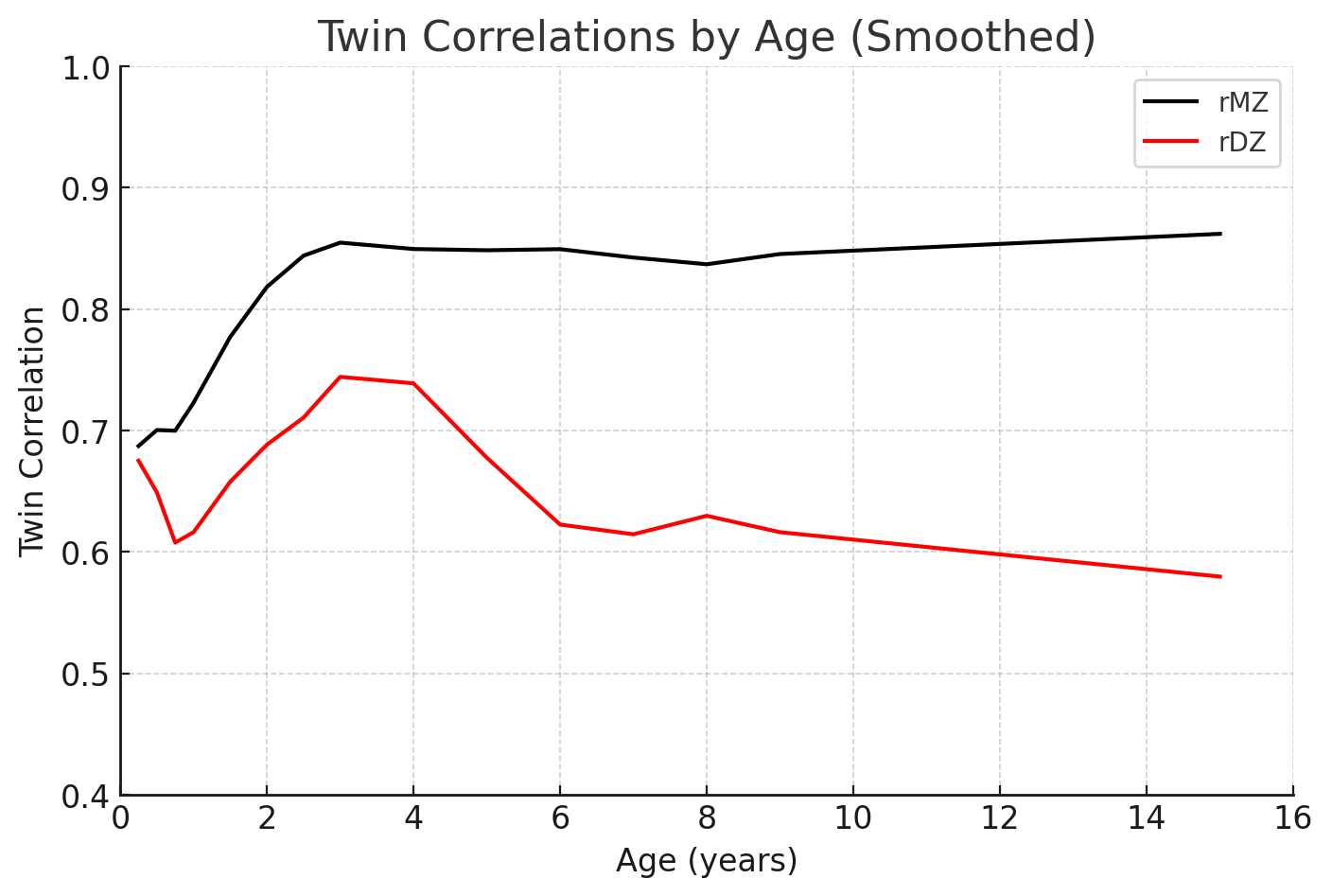
Twin correlations over development (data from Wilson 1983)

The interaction between heritability and age over the course of development has been the interest of scientists for many years. Perhaps first described by Ronald Wilson, researchers have noted changes in kinship correlations over the life course. Particularly in the case of twins, the correlation between monozygotic twins remains relatively constant, while the correlation between dizygotic twins decreases. Some early attempts at modeling this change have equivocal results, with Rao et al. finding that heritability increased in adulthood in one model, but not in another, while a later study by Devlin et al. did not find support for age moderation of heritability. Most researchers in behavioral genetics now believe that estimates of heritability from classical family studies (adoption, twin studies) increase as individuals age,. One review described a "linearly increasing heritability of intelligence from infancy (20%) through adulthood (60%)". This increase in heritability with age is known as the "Wilson Effect". There are two possible explanations for why measured heritability might increase over the course of the lifespan: that new genetic factors are activated (genetic innovation) or that previous genetic factors explain more variance (genetic amplification). Behavioral genetics researchers believe that genetic amplification is most supported by the evidence, where the same genetic factors that influence IQ at one age are involved later, but produce larger and larger phenotypic effects over time. One theory proposed to explain the apparent increase in heritability values is a reciprocal effects model, where environments and genes become correlated over the course of development. These models incorporate phenotype to environment associations that violate the independence assumption in traditional behavioral genetic models that may overestimate heritability. Another proposed explanation for why measured heritability can increase over the course of development is gene-environment interactions.

Recent molecular genetics research has also investigated the interaction between genetics or heritability and age over the course of development. One 2018 genome-wide association study found "comparable heritability across age". Another study found that the within-family estimate heritability was 0.12 in childhood, 0.13 in adolescence and 0.15 in adulthood.

== Implications ==
=== Development ===
Some researchers, especially those that work in fields like developmental systems theory, have criticized the concept of heritability as misleading or meaningless. Douglas Wahlsten and Gilbert Gottlieb argue that the prevailing models of behavioral genetics are too simplistic by not accounting for gene-environment interactions. Stephen Ceci also highlights the issues with this assumption, noting that they were first raised by Jane Loevinger in 1943. They assert that the idea of partitioning variance makes no sense when environments and genes interact and argue that such interaction is ubiquitous in human development. They highlight their belief that heritability analysis requires a hidden assumption they call the "separation of causes", which isn't borne out by biological reality or experimental research. Such researchers argue that the notion of heritability gives the false impression that "genes have some direct and isolated influence on traits", rather than another developmental resource that a complex system uses over the course of ontogeny.

=== Between-group heritability ===
Although IQ differences between individuals have been shown to have a hereditary component, it does not follow that differences in average IQ test performance between racial and ethnic groups have a genetic basis. The scientific consensus is that genetics does not explain average differences in IQ test performance between racial groups. Growing evidence indicates that environmental factors, not genetic ones, explain the racial IQ gap.

Arguments in support of a genetic explanation of racial differences in average IQ are sometimes fallacious. For instance, some hereditarians have cited as evidence the failure of known environmental factors to account for such differences, or the high heritability of intelligence within races. In 1972, John DeFries attempted to connect "between group heritability" or h^{2}_{B} to "within group heritability" or h^{2}_{W} in an equation $h^2_B\approx h^2_W \frac{(1-t)r}{(1-r)t}$, where r is the intraclass genetic correlation among members of the same group, t is corresponding phenotypic intraclass correlation. However, this equation is tautological as the term r is defined in reference to variance among and between groups, meaning r, if anything, depends on h^{2}_{B}. Geneticists Joshua Schraiber and Michael Edge showed that even if this quantity r is known, the quantity h^{2}_{B} is still consistent with "infinitely many configurations of genetic differences among populations". They conclude:

Perfect knowledge of within-group heritability provides no information about between-group heritability. Crucially, even if the heritability of between-group differences is estimated correctly, it leaves the direction of the genetic and environmental components of phenotypic difference unclear.

In 2017, the editorial board of Nature to issued a statement differentiating current research on the genetics of intelligence from the racist pseudoscience which it acknowledged has dogged intelligence research since its inception. It characterized the idea of genetically determined differences in intelligence between races as definitively false. Analysis of polygenic scores sampled from the 1000 Genomes Project has likewise found no evidence that intelligence was under diversifying selection in Africans and Europeans, suggesting that genetic differences cannot be a significant factor in the observed Black-White gap in average IQ test performance.

== See also ==
- Human intelligence – Human capacity or ability to acquire, apprehend and apply knowledge
- Outline of human intelligence
- Sex differences in intelligence – Area of scientific research
- Impact of health on intelligence
- Behavioral epigenetics – Study of epigenetics' influencing behavior

== Sources ==
- Campbell, Frances A; Ramey, Craig T; Pungello, Elizabeth; Sparling, Joseph; Miller-Johnson, Shari (2002). "Early Childhood Education: Young Adult Outcomes From the Abecedarian Project". Applied Developmental Science. 6: 42–57. doi:10.1207/s1532480xads0601_05. S2CID 71602425.
- Cooper, R. S. (2005). "Race and IQ: Molecular Genetics as Deus ex Machina". American Psychologist. 60 (1): 71–76. doi:10.1037/0003-066X.60.1.71. PMID 15641923.
- Daley, C. E.; Onwuegbuzie, A. J. (2011). "Race and Intelligence". In Sternberg, R.; Kaufman, S. B. (eds.). The Cambridge Handbook of Intelligence. Cambridge New York: Cambridge University Press. pp. 293–306. ISBN 978-0-521-51806-2.
- Nevid, Jeffrey S. (2014-01-17). Essentials of Psychology: Concepts and Applications. Cengage Learning. ISBN 978-1-285-75122-1. Archived from the original on 2023-03-20.
- Reichman, Nancy E. (2005). "Low birth weight and school readiness". The Future of Children. 15 (1): 91–116. doi:10.1353/foc.2005.0008. ISSN 1054-8289. PMID 16130543. S2CID 23345980.
