= Ross Flom =

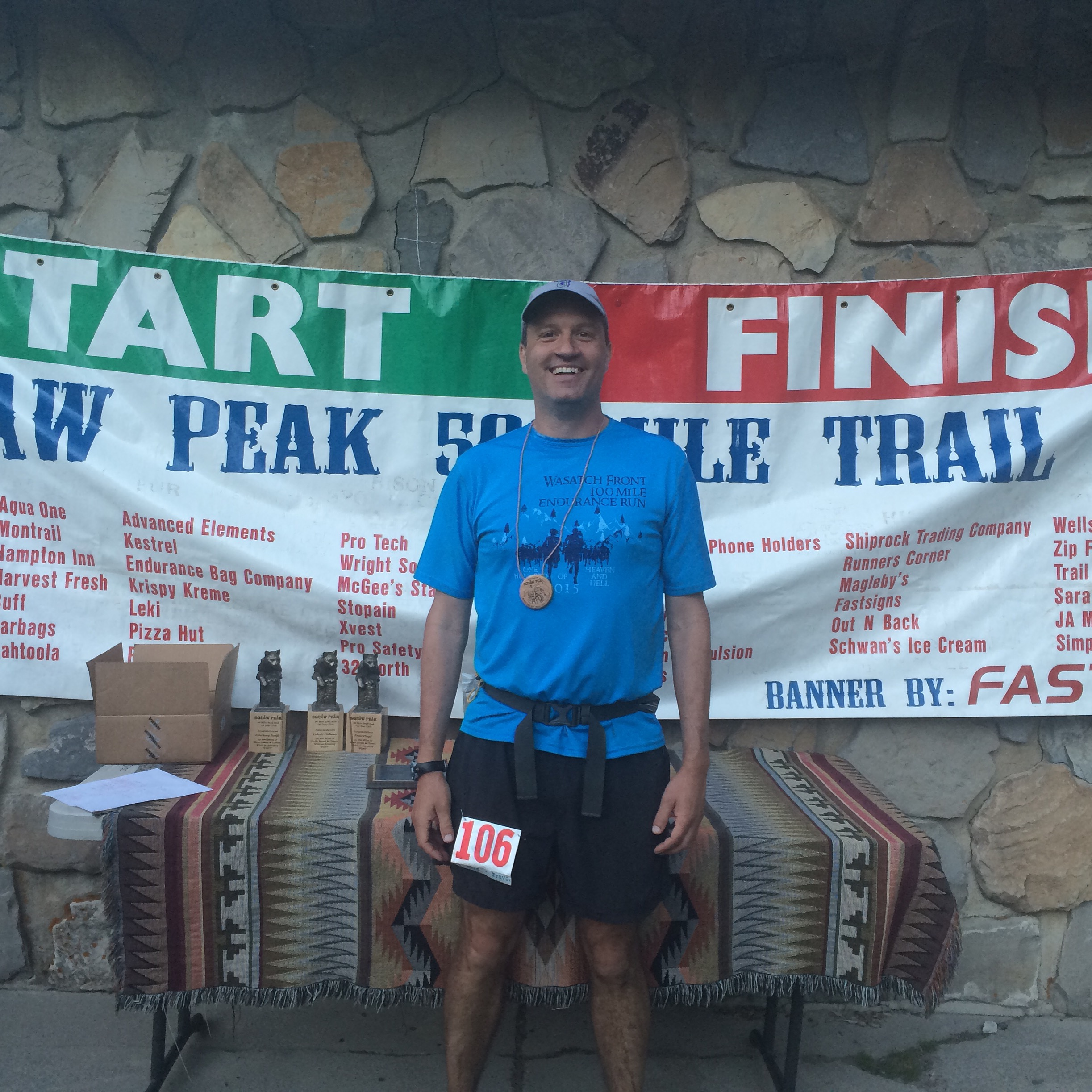
2016

Ross A. Flom (born 1969) is from Minneapolis MN and is an American developmental psychologist and professor at Southern Utah University. Ross received his Ph.D. from the University of Minnesota in 1999 and completed his post-doctoral training with Lorraine Bahrick and Robert Lickliter from 1999 to 2001 at Florida International University.

Ross Flom was a Professor of Psychology and Neuroscience at BYU from 2001 to 2017. Ross is known for his research examining the development of intersensory perception, perception of affect, and perceptual development in human infants.

Ross is currently an associate editor for the Journal of Experimental Child Psychology and Infant Behavior and Development.

Ross is also a professional ski instructor and ultramarathoner.
