= Lickliter =

Lickliter is a surname. Notable people with the surname include:

- Frank Lickliter (b. 1969), American golfer
- Robert Lickliter (fl. 1983), American psychologist and professor
- Todd Lickliter (b. 1955), American basketball coach
