= Probabilistic epigenesis =

Probabilistic epigenesis is a way of understanding human behavior based on the relationship between experience and biology. It is a variant form of epigenetics, proposed by American psychologist Gilbert Gottlieb in 1991. Gottlieb’s model is based on Conrad H. Waddington's idea of developmental epigenesis. Both theories examine the complexity of the ways in which the brain develops and explore factors that occur outside the genome. However, probabilistic epigenesis differs from Waddington’s model as it relies much more heavily on the potential developmental impacts of experience and environment and how they interact with an individual’s genes. Probabilistic epigenesis takes into account developmental, hormonal, environmental, neuropsychological, and genetic factors in order to explain various forms of behavior.

== In developmental psychology ==
In developmental psychology, probabilistic epigenesis is a theory of human behavior that assumes that different neural structures develop and activate either based on an individual's biology or interactions with their environment. It relies on the idea that there are multi-directional interactions between biological and psychological factors, meaning probabilistic epigenesis is a non-hierarchical model of understanding development.

The biological factors, also known as genetic determinants, involve an individual's genetic makeup, and how it influences their behavior. These factors must be looked at alongside environment variables, however, as the number of genes in a human brain is insufficient in regards to explaining all aspects of the human mind–there is simply not enough storage. According to the theory of probabilistic epigenesis, the environment (socioeconomic, household, etc.) in which a person lives and interacts with contributes to overall behavioral development by triggering certain genetic information to activate.

=== Socioeconomic environment ===
The relationship between socioeconomically disadvantaged youth and poor physical health is a topic notably evaluated by James Hamblin. Research has proven there is a correlation between disadvantaged youth and high blood pressure, excess body fat, and high levels of cortisol. The pressures associated with a low socioeconomic background have proven to produce chronic stress in individuals who strive for upward mobility, likely due to the increased familial and social pressures. Subsequently, chronic stress has been linked to a breakdown in bodily functions, and is thus a stimulant for disease. In other words, this means that the extrinsic factor of socioeconomic class can cause an individual to be less physically capable of handling stress and heavy workloads than someone born into a wealthier environment. This means that their self-control and work ethic comes with the price of their health, as people from low socioeconomic backgrounds are more likely to age faster at the cellular level.

=== Household environment ===
An unpredictable and chaotic household structure can be linked to socioemotional development. Socioemotional development, if occurring in an environment that lacks a regular pattern, can result in behavioral difficulties and symptoms of internalization.

An example of this can be seen in a study conducted by Urie Bronfenbrenner, in which he examines how the exchange of energy between the developing child and the persons and objects in their close settings effects their development. His research ultimately suggests that the more regular and positive these household interactions are, the better the child will perform academically and the less likely they will be to internalize problems.

== In neuropsychology ==
Gottlieb's model of probabilistic epigenesis is based on the idea that certain areas of the brain are operational before they are completely developed. This means that, while the development process is occurring, neural structures are prone to influence–either internal or external. The multi-directional relationship between these influences is again important when regarding brain development into maturation, as brain maturation and functional experience are both the cause and effect of one another.

=== Contrasting the "nature versus nurture" model ===
“Nature versus nurture,” a term coined by Francis Galton in the late 1800s, was an early and simple way of explaining human behavior. In this model, child development into adolescence and adulthood can be explained either by intrinsic aspects of the child or by extrinsic factors influencing the child.

Probabilistic epigenesis draws from this model in that it emphasizes the importance of factors that could be categorized as nature and/or nurture. However, it expands upon and complicates the idea that it is either nature or nurture that causes a person to act a certain way. In probabilistic epigenesis, nature and nurture interact so that every variable is both a cause and an effect. As developmental and neurological understandings have progressed, the idea that intrinsic and extrinsic factors interact with one another rather than independently, as suggested in the probabilistic epigenesis model, has become the predominant way of understanding behavior.

== See also ==
- Epigenesis (biology)
