= Lorraine Bahrick =

American developmental psychologist

- Occupation: Professor of Psychology

Academic background
- Education: Cornell University; Hampshire College

Lorraine E. Bahrick is a developmental psychologist known for her research on intermodal perception and effects of inter-sensory redundancy on learning in infancy and early childhood. Her work in these areas involves investigating how the integration of information from various sensory modalities, such as vision, hearing, and touch, contributes to the cognitive, perceptual, and social development of infants and children. She also explores how the redundancy or overlap of sensory information, influences these developmental processes. She is Distinguished University Professor of Psychology at Florida International University and the Director of Infant Development Lab.

== Biography ==
Lorraine Bahrick was a born into a family of psychologists. Her father, Harry Bahrick, a leading expert on human memory, was a faculty member in the psychology department at Ohio Wesleyan University. Her mother, Phyllis Bahrick, served as a psychologist in the Ohio Wesleyan University Counseling Service and also taught courses in the psychology department. Bahrick grew up with an aspiration to follow in her parents' professional footsteps, but charted a distinct path by focusing on cognitive and perceptual development in infancy and childhood, diverging significantly from her father's work with adults.

Bahrick received her B.A. degree from Hampshire College in 1975. She attended graduate school at Cornell University, where she obtained her Ph.D. in 1979 in experimental and cognitive psychology under the supervision of Ulric Neisser and Eleanor Gibson. Though Bahrick's research initially focused on adult cognition, her interests shifted to infancy and early child development because she believe that children provided a window into understanding adult behavior. At Cornell, she conducted research on infant development with Neisser and Gibson, and studied motivation under the supervision of A. Wade Boykin. With Gibson and others, she published her first paper titled Detection of elasticity as an invariant property of objects by young infants, marking the beginning of her research career aimed at uncovering general principles of infant perceptual development. Her Ph.D. dissertation research on infants' perception of temporal synchrony in multimodal events, suggested that emergence of intermodal perception relies on detecting invariant relationships in visual and auditory stimuli.

Bahrick was a Postdoctoral Fellow at University of California, Berkeley from 1979 to 1980, where she worked under the mentorship of John S. Watson. During her postdoc, she continued to delve into the field of infant perception. Her paper Detection of intermodal proprioceptive–visual contingency as a potential basis of self-perception in infancy suggested that the consistency offered by a live presentation of one's body motion is perceived by detecting the unchanging intermodal connection between proprioceptive information for motion and the visual display of that motion. Recognizing these relationships is fundamental to infant's development of self-perception.

From 1981 to 1983, Bahrick was an Assistant Research Psychologist II at University of California, Berkeley. In 1983, she joined the faculty of Florida International University as an Assistant Professor of Psychology in the College of Arts, Science & Education, and has remained there throughout her career. She was a Visiting Scholar at the Department of Psychology, Stanford University in 2010. Her research has been funded by the National Institutes of Health National Science Foundation, and Autism Speaks and has been published in the top journals in developmental psychology.

== Research and grants ==
Bahrick's initial research focused on uncovering general principles of infant perceptual development, aiming to understand developmental cascades––how basic attention skills in infancy serve as building blocks for later language and social development, and in turn, school readiness (e.g. self-regulation and pre-literacy skills). In one of early studies, she demonstrated that the temporal synchrony between vocalizations and object motions plays a crucial role in infant's word learning. Later, she began working with Robert Lickliter, a developmental psychobiologist, on studies of the development of multisensory perception, selective attention, social, and language functioning in infants, toddlers, and children with typical and atypical development. They proposed the Intersensory Redundancy Hypothesis, that the redundancy of information across different sensory modalities influences how infants allocate attention and learn perceptual properties. While unimodal presentation draws attention to modality-specific features, multimodal presentation enhances learning of shared, amodal properties. Peter Mundy became interested in their work and started to explore intersensory processing and early development in the context of autism, providing further evidence that attentional selectivity and perceptual learning in infancy are guided by intersensory redundancy.

Bahrick used her research expertise to develop the Multisensory Attention Assessment Protocol, which measures three key multisensory attention skills in preverbal infants: sustained attention, the speed of attention shifting, and synchrony detection. As an innovation, this protocol allows for audiovisual looking time data to be collected remotely. She also developed the Intersensory Processing Efficiency Protocol, a more difficult test that assesses infants, children, and adults' efficiency in matching redundant auditory and visual information by requiring them to bind a stream of auditory information to one specific visual event from an array.

Bahrick has received considerable support from the National Institutes of Health to study the development of multisensory attention skills. One project, involving infants from ages three months to three years, examined how infants' distractibility influences the effect of maternal responsiveness on early language outcomes. With co-investigators Elizabeth V. Edgar James Todd, Shannon Pruden, and Bethany Reeb-Sutherland, Bahrick received funding from the National Institute of Child Health and Human Development to examine how intersensory processing in infancy influences the relation between socioeconomic status and working memory in early childhood. Other work, supported by a grant from the National Science Foundation, examined relations among children's memory recall, stress, and psychological functioning following Hurricane Andrew, furthering understanding of how children remember and cope with traumatic events.

== Representative publications ==
- Bahrick, L. E. (1988). Intermodal learning in infancy: Learning on the basis of two kinds of invariant relations in audible and visible events. Child Development, 59(1), 197–209.
- Bahrick, L. E., & Lickliter, R. (2000). Intersensory redundancy guides attentional selectivity and perceptual learning in infancy. Developmental Psychology, 36(2), 190–201.
- Bahrick, L. E., Lickliter, R., & Flom, R. (2004). Intersensory redundancy guides the development of selective attention, perception, and cognition in infancy. Current Directions in Psychological Science, 13(3), 99–102
- Edgar, E. V., Todd, J. T., & Bahrick, L. E. (2022). Intersensory matching of faces and voices in infancy predicts language outcomes in young children. Developmental Psychology, 58(8), 1413–1428.
- Todd, J. T., & Bahrick, L. E. (2022). Individual Differences in Multisensory Attention Skills in Children with Autism Spectrum Disorder Predict Language and Symptom Severity: Evidence from the Multisensory Attention Assessment Protocol (MAAP). Journal of Autism and Developmental Disorders, 1–26.
