= Gilbert Gottlieb =

American psychologist (1929–2006)

- Born: 22 October 1929; Brooklyn, New York, U.S.
- Died: 13 July 2006 (aged 76); Raleigh, North Carolina, U.S.
- Education: University of Miami (B.S., M.S.); Duke University (Ph.D.)
- Known for: Probabilistic epigenesis; Imprinting
- Spouse: Nora Lee Willis Gottlieb
- Children: 4
- Scientific career
- Workplaces: Dorothea Dix Hospital (North Carolina); The Center for Developmental Science at the University of North Carolina; Excellence Foundation Professor and Head of the Department of Psychology at the University of North Carolina at Greensboro
- Thesis: The Following Response of Wild and Domestic Ducklings of the Same Species (Anas platyrhynchos) (1960)
- Academic advisors: Theodore C. Schneirla
- Notable students: Robert Lickliter

Gilbert Gottlieb (22 October 1929 – 13 July 2006) was an American psychologist.

After receiving his bachelor's and master's degrees from the University of Miami, he received his Ph.D. in the psychology - zoology program at Duke University. He observed the differences in bird development, by both observing egg hatching and manipulating variables important to bird development, including calls. Gottlieb's major contribution to the field of psychology was his theory of probabilistic epigenesis, which explains that there is no predetermined path to trait development. Gottlieb died 13 July 2006 in Raleigh, North Carolina. He was married to Nora Lee Willis Gottlieb with four children.

== Life and career ==
Gottlieb was born in Brooklyn, New York on 22 October 1929.

He received the Distinguished Scientific Contributions to Child Development Award from the Society of Research in Child Development in 1977. in 1982 he was an Excellence Foundation Professor and Head of the Department of Psychology at the university of North Carolina at Greensboro. After this he received his Ph.D. in Duke's joint psychology-zoology program, allowing him to further his research on birds. From 1961 to 1982, Gottlieb led the research lab at Dorothea Dix Hospital in Raleigh, an unusual case of research on animals' naturally occurring behavior being conducted at a psychiatric hospital lab. In 1983 he was elected a Fellow of the American Association for the Advancement of Science. Gottlieb died July 13, 2006.

== Research ==
As a graduate student Gottlieb studied behavior imprinting of ducklings. He noticed that duck eggs laid at the same time hatched at different times. He expanded the research by Eckhard Hess by "plott[ing] the bird's responsiveness in terms of developmental age - the age from the beginning of embryonic development" (p. 446). The problem that Gottlieb found with Hess' research is that he would not replicate what Hess called the "critical period" for imprinting. The developmental age that Gottlieb measured characterized this "critical period" with an "appropriate" independent variable. Gottlieb suggests that imprinting may be the result of a series of complex and subtle feedback processes.

Gottlieb continued his research involving birds by depriving mallard ducks of auditory sensory stimulation experienced in normal development. He then exposed them to both chicken and mallard calls. He found that instincts do not solely depend on experience, but influential social situations.

Gottlieb's major contribution to psychology was his theory of probabilistic epigenesis, which states that behavioral development does not have a predetermined course. He described "experiential effects as facilitating, inducing, and maintaining development" (p. 163).

== Publications ==
- (1991a). Experiential canalization of behavioral development: Theory. Developmental Psychology, 27, 4–13.
- (1991b). Experiential canalization of behavioral development: Results. Developmental Psychology, 27, 35–39.
- (2007). Probabilistic epigenesis. Developmental Science, 10, 1–11.
- (1997). Synthesizing nature and nurture: Prenatal roots of instinctive behavior. Lawrence Erlbaum Associates.
- With Krasnegor, N. A. (1985). Measurement of audition and vision in the first year of postnatal life. Ablex Publishing.
- (1971). Development of species identification in birds: An inquiry into the prenatal determinants of perception. (1 ed.). Chicago: University of Chicago Press.
- (1973). Behavioral embryology (studies on the development of behavior and the nervous system. (Vol. 1). Academic Press.
- (1968). Prenatal behavior of birds. Quart Rev Biology.
