= Postgenomic era =

Time period from after the completion of the Human Genome Project to the present day

In genomics, the postgenomic era (or post-genomic era) refers to the time period from after the completion of the Human Genome Project (HGP) to the present day. The name refers to the fact that the genetic epistemology of contemporary science has progressed beyond the gene-centered view of the earlier genomic era. It is defined by the widespread availability of both the human genome sequence and of the complete genomes of many reference organisms.

The postgenomic era is characterized by a paradigm shift in which new genetic research has upended many dogmas about the way in which genes influence phenotypes, and the way in which the term "gene" itself is defined. This has included a new conceptualization of genes as being constituted during "genome expression", and the creation of the discipline of functional genomics to analyze genomic data and convert it to useful information. It has also seen major changes in the way scientific research is conducted and its results publicized, with open science initiatives allowing knowledge creation to occur well outside the traditional environment of the laboratory. This has led to extensive debate about whether the best way to conduct genomic research is at a small or large scale.

Soon after the HGP's results were initially announced in 2000, researchers predicted that these results would lead to individualized treatment and more accurate testing for human diseases. More recently, researchers have suggested that the way in which human diseases are classified needs to be updated in light of the results of the HGP.
