= Robert Lickliter =

American psychologist

- Education: University of California, Davis
- Known for: Perception; Psychobiology; Selective attention
- Scientific career
- Fields: Developmental psychology
- Workplaces: Virginia Tech; Florida International University
- Thesis: Mother-infant relationship and development of social behavior in the domestic goat (1983)
- Academic advisors: Gilbert Gottlieb

Robert Earl Lickliter is an American developmental psychologist and professor at Florida International University. He is known for researching the development of intersensory perception and selective attention in humans and other animals. He is a fellow of the Association for Psychological Science and the Society for Behavioral Neuroscience and Comparative Psychology.
