= Steven E. Jones =

American physicist (born 1949)

Steven Earl Jones (born March 25, 1949) is an American physicist. Among scientists, Jones became known for his research into muon-catalyzed fusion and geo-fusion. Jones is also known for his association with 9/11 conspiracy theories. Jones has claimed that airplane crashes and fires could not have caused the fall of the World Trade Center Towers and 7 World Trade Center, suggesting controlled demolition instead. In late 2006, Brigham Young University (BYU) officials placed him on paid leave until he elected to retire in an agreement with BYU. Jones continued research and writing following his early retirement from BYU.

== Education ==
Jones earned his bachelor's degree in physics, magna cum laude, from Brigham Young University in 1973, and his Ph.D. in physics from Vanderbilt University in 1978. From 1974 to 1977, Jones conducted his PhD research at the Stanford Linear Accelerator Center (SLAC), and post-doctoral research at Cornell University and the Los Alamos Meson Physics Facility.

== Research interests ==
Jones conducted research at the Idaho National Laboratory, in Idaho Falls, Idaho where, from 1979 to 1985, he was a senior engineering specialist. He was principal investigator for experimental muon-catalyzed fusion from 1982 to 1991 for the United States Department of Energy (DOE), Division of Advanced Energy Projects. From 1985 to 1993, Jones studied deuterium-based fusion in the context of condensed matter physics under DOE and Electric Power Research Institute sponsorship. Jones also collaborated in experiments at other physics laboratories, including TRIUMF (Vancouver, British Columbia), LANL (Los Alamos, NM), KEK (Tsukuba, Japan), and the Rutherford Appleton Laboratory near Oxford University.

Around 1985, Jones became interested in anomalous concentrations of helium-3 and tritium found in gases escaping from volcanoes. He hypothesized that metals and high pressures in the Earth's interior might make fusion more likely, and began a series of experiments on what he referred to as geo-fusion, or piezofusion, high-pressure fusion. To characterize the reactions, Jones claimed to have designed and constructed a neutron counter that was capable of accurately measuring minuscule numbers of neutrons produced in his experiments. The counter indicated that a small amount of fusion was occurring, according to Jones, but that it was likely not useful energy production.

Jones' interests extend to archaeometry, solar energy, and, like numerous professors at BYU, archaeology and the Book of Mormon. He has interpreted archaeological evidence from the ancient Mayans as supporting his faith's belief that Jesus Christ (when resurrected) visited America. Jones is a member of the Church of Jesus Christ of Latter-day Saints and has been described as "a devout Mormon." In 2016-17, he and his wife served as full-time Senior Missionaries in the New Jersey Morristown Mission of the Church.

=== Muon-catalyzed fusion ===
In the mid-1980s, Jones and other BYU scientists worked on what he referred to as Cold Nuclear Fusion in a Scientific American article (the process is currently known as muon-catalyzed fusion to avoid confusion with the cold fusion concept proposed by the University of Utah's Stanley Pons and Martin Fleischmann). Muon-catalyzed fusion was a field of some interest during the 1980s as a potential energy source; however, its low energy output appears to be unavoidable (because of alpha-muon sticking losses). Jones led a research team that, in 1986, achieved 150 fusions per muon (average), releasing over 2,600 MeV of fusion energy per muon, a record which still stands.

Pons and Fleischmann commenced their work at approximately the same time. Jones became aware of their work when they applied for research funding from the DOE, after which the DOE forwarded their proposal to Jones for peer review. When Jones realized that their work was similar, he and Pons and Fleischmann agreed to release their papers to Nature on the same day (March 24, 1989). However, Pons and Fleischmann announced their results at a press event the day before Jones faxed his paper to Nature.

According to a New York Times report, although peer reviewers were harshly critical of Pons' and Fleischmann's research, they did not apply such criticism to Jones' significantly more modest, theoretically supported findings. Critics insisted that Jones' results were probably caused by experimental error; the majority of the reviewing physicists claimed that he was a careful scientist. Later research and experiments have supported Jones' metallic "cold fusion" (geo-fusion) reports.

In July 2013, Jones gave a poster talk at the 18th International Conference on Condensed Matter Nuclear Science at the University of Missouri, titled, "Empirical Evidence for Two Distinct Effects: Low-level d-d Fusion in Metals and Anomalous Excess Heat."

== 9/11 conspiracy theories ==
=== World Trade Center destruction paper and response ===
On September 22, 2005, at a BYU seminar attended by around 60 people, Jones publicly presented his views regarding the 2001 collapse of the World Trade Center towers and 7 World Trade Center during the September 11 attacks. Jones noted he believed it was more likely a controlled demolition, using thermite, referencing the speed and symmetry of the collapses, and characteristics of dust jets. Later, Jones said he had identified grey-red flakes found in the dust as nanothermite traces and that the thermite reaction products (aluminium oxide and iron-rich microspheres) were also found in the dust. Shortly after the seminar, Jones placed a research paper entitled "Why Indeed Did the WTC Buildings Collapse?" on his page in the Physics department Web site, commenting that BYU had no responsibility for the paper.

The paper was self-published in the online Journal of 9/11 Studies, a journal co-founded and co-edited by Jones. It also appeared in a volume of essays, 9/11 and American Empire: Intellectuals Speak Out, edited by David Ray Griffin and Peter Dale Scott. It was controversial both for its content and its claims to scientific rigor. Jones' early critics included members of BYU's engineering faculty; shortly after he made his views public, the BYU College of Physical and Mathematical Sciences and the faculty of structural engineering issued statements in which they distanced themselves from Jones' work. They noted that Jones' "hypotheses and interpretations of evidence were being questioned by scholars and practitioners," and expressed doubts on whether they had been "submitted to relevant scientific venues that would ensure rigorous technical peer review."

Over the following year, Jones presented his WTC research in lectures at Idaho State University, Utah Valley State College, University of Colorado at Boulder and University of Denver, University of California at Berkeley and Davis, and the University of Texas at Austin.

==== Retirement from BYU ====
On September 7, 2006, Jones removed his paper from BYU's website at the request of administrators and was placed on paid leave. The university cited its concern about the "increasingly speculative and accusatory nature" of Jones' work and that perhaps Jones' research had "not been published in appropriate scientific venues" as reasons for putting him under review. Six weeks later he chose to retire, and the review was not pursued further.

Some of Jones' colleagues also defended Jones' 9/11 work, and Project Censored listed his 9/11 research among the top mainstream media censored stories of 2007. His placement on paid leave drew criticism from the American Association of University Professors and the Foundation for Individual Rights in Education. Both organizations have long been critics of BYU's record on academic freedom.

=== Subsequent papers ===
Jones was later interviewed by mainstream news sources and made public appearances. He urged caution in drawing conclusions. His name was often mentioned in reporting about 9/11 conspiracy theories.

In August 2008, Jones, along with Kevin Ryan and James Gourley, published a peer-reviewed article in The Environmentalist, titled, 'Environmental anomalies at the World Trade Center: Evidence for energetic materials'.

In April 2009, Jones co-authored a paper in The Open Chemical Physics Journal, titled, 'Active Thermitic Material Discovered in Dust from the 9/11 World Trade Center Catastrophe'. The editor of the journal, Professor Marie-Paule Pileni, an expert in explosives and nano-technology, resigned. She received an e-mail from the Danish science journal Videnskab asking for her professional assessment of the article's content. According to Pileni, the article was published without her authorization. Subsequently, numerous concerns arose regarding the reliability of the publisher, Bentham Science Publishers. This included the publishing an allegedly peer reviewed article generated by SCIgen (although this program has also successfully submitted papers to IEEE and Springer), the resignation of multiple people at the administrative level, and soliciting article submissions from researchers in unrelated fields through spam.

Europhysics News, in August 2016, published a feature "15 Years Later: On the Physics of High-rise Building Collapses," which strongly challenges the official U.S. Government (NIST) narrative of the collapse of WTC7 and the WTC Towers, including a disclaimer about the speculative and not peer reviewed status of the article. The paper was authored by Steven Jones, Robert Korol, Anthony Szamboti and Ted Walter.

=== Scholars, Architects, and Engineers for 9/11 Truth ===
In December 2005, Jones was a founding member of Scholars for 9/11 Truth. In 2006, most of its members left that organization to establish Scholars for 9/11 Truth & Justice. Also in 2006, Jones became a founding member of Architects & Engineers for 9/11 Truth, and an editor of the Journal of 9/11 Studies.

== Recognition and awards ==
- 1968, David O. McKay Scholarship at BYU; National Merit Scholar
- 1973–1978 Tuition Scholarship and Research Fellowship at Vanderbilt University
- 1989 Outstanding Young Scholar Award (BYU); Best of What's New for 1989 (Popular Science); Creativity Prize (Japanese Creativity Society)
- 1990 BYU Young Scholar Award; Annual Lecturer, BYU Chapter of Sigma Xi
- 2005 BYU Alcuin Award and Fellowship, for excellence in teaching
