= Loose Change =

2005–2009 series of films by Dylan Avery

- Loose Change 9/11: An American Coup; DVD cover
- Directed by: Dylan Avery
- Written by: Dylan Avery
- Produced by: Korey Rowe; Dylan Avery; Jason Bermas; Matthew Brown; Executive Producers: Alex Jones (Final Cut); Tim Sparke (Final Cut); Associate Producers: Joel Bachar (American Coup); Patrick Kwiatkowski (American Coup)
- Edited by: Dylan Avery
- Music by: DJ Skooly
- Distributed by: Microcinema International
- Release date: April 13, 2005
- Running time: 61 min. (1st Edition); 82 min. (2nd Edition); 89 min. (Recut); 130 min. (Final Cut); 99 min. (American Coup); 51 min. (2015 Edition); 70 min. (2nd Edition Remastered and Re-edited)
- Country: United States
- Language: English
- Budget: $2,000 (1st Edition) $6,000 (2nd Edition) $200,000 (Final Cut) $1,000,000 (American Coup)

Loose Change is a series of seven films released between 2005 and 2017 that argue in favor of certain conspiracy theories relating to the September 11 attacks. The films were written and directed by Dylan Avery and produced by Korey Rowe, Jason Bermas, and Matthew Brown.

The original 2005 film was edited and re-released as Loose Change: 2nd Edition (2006), a third time for the 2nd Edition Recut (2006), and then subsequently edited for a fourth time for the HD Remastered Edition (2017). Loose Change: Final Cut was released on DVD and Web-streaming format on November 11, 2007.

Another version of the film, Loose Change 9/11: An American Coup, released on September 22, 2009, is narrated by Daniel Sunjata and distributed by Microcinema International.

Coverage of the film increased in 2006 with the recut release having airings on U.S. and European television stations and over four million views online in four months, leading Vanity Fair to say it could be the first Internet blockbuster.

Loose Change asserts that the account of the Pentagon attack, World Trade Center collapse and United 93 phone calls and crash is implausible and instead suggests the 9/11 attacks were a false flag operation.

== History ==
In May 2003, when researching for a fictional screenplay based on the 9/11 attacks, writer Dylan Avery felt there was enough evidence to support the 9/11 conspiracy theories that the attacks were orchestrated by members of the United States government, and started working on a non-fiction version. The name is a pun on the idea of political change concerning 9/11 conspiracy theories and others allegedly related to it, hence renegade or "loose," and the idiom loose change as coins or pocket change.

In April 2005, the first edition of Loose Change was made available for free on the Internet and was given a limited DVD release with 50,000 sold and 100,000 given away. It cost around $2,000 to make and was made primarily on Avery's laptop computer. Avery's childhood friend, Korey Rowe, left the service of the United States Army in June 2005 to assist with the marketing of the movie. Soon after Avery decided that "there was new information that needed to be added and improvements made," and so began creating Loose Change: 2nd Edition. Rowe assumed the role of producer, and Jason Bermas, a graphic designer, worked as production assistant. This edition cost around $6,000. It was originally released in December 2005, but was re-released in June 2006 as Loose Change: 2nd Edition Recut. Before the release of this edition, Avery, Rowe and Bermas set up an independent movie production company called Louder than Words, an organization that identifies with the 9/11 Truth Movement. In April 2009 the rights to Loose Change were bought by Microcinema International DVD.

In August 2006, Rowe was featured in an article admitting to the inaccuracy found in Loose Change, such as inaccurately stating a B-52 flew into the Empire State Building (it was actually a B-25 in the 1940s). "We don't ever come out and say that everything we say is 100 percent. We know there are errors in the documentary, and we've actually left them in there so that people discredit us and do the research for themselves." In 2007, media entrepreneur Mark Cuban was going to distribute Loose Change, entrepreneur Matthew Brown would finance, and Charlie Sheen was going to narrate the film. However, this did not happen; Fox News political talk show host Bill O'Reilly interviewed Cuban on his radio show and said Sheen's career would be over if he narrated it.

The third edition of the movie, Loose Change Final Cut, was released in November 2007. According to the Loose Change website, this edition "is substantially different from Loose Change and Loose Change 2nd Edition Recut in the way it presents the information surrounding 9/11/2001. However, it remains true to the spirit that has made Loose Change what it is today." Professor David Ray Griffin was brought on as script consultant, and radio host Alex Jones and Tim Sparke of Mercury Media served as executive producers. Due to an estimated cost of $200,000, this version is the first that is not available for free online, although it is in fact available for free on Google Video and YouTube in a lower quality version. This edition is over two hours in length, substantially longer than previous versions.

Director Avery, producer Rowe and entrepreneur Matthew Brown released a new film through their production company, Collective Minds Media Company, entitled Loose Change 9/11: An American Coup on September 22, 2009. The film is distributed by Microcinema International. It is narrated by Daniel Sunjata, and explores historical events leading to 9/11 and its aftermath. It was financed by Joel Bachar and Patrick Kwiatkowski of Microcinema International, and its world premiere was on September 9, 2009, at the 9/11 Film Festival at the Grand Lake Theater in Oakland, California.

== Recut contents ==
Flyer for a screening of the film

Loose Change 2nd Edition Recut (2006) opens with a brief description of past suspicious and questionable motives in the history of American government. This discussion mentions Operation Northwoods, a plan put forward during the Cuban Missile Crisis in 1962 to launch false flag terrorist attacks against the United States and blame them on Cuba as a pretext to invade that country. Focus is particularly directed at the previously proposed plans to substitute real commercial airliners with pilotless drone aircraft in order to investigate the plausibility of covertly using them as weapons while maintaining the cover of an accident.

Attention is also given to the Project for the New American Century, a neo-conservative think-tank that dissolved in 2006 that released a report in 2000 titled "Rebuilding America's Defenses". In particular the film points out a line from that report that states:

The process of transformation, even if it brings revolutionary change, is likely to be a long one, absent some catastrophic and catalyzing event – like a new Pearl Harbor.

— Defense Secretary Donald Rumsfeld

It also highlights the fact that during the same year the report was released, the Pentagon conducted the first of two training exercises that simulated a Boeing 757 crashing into the building. It also says that from September 6 to 10, an unusual amount of put options were placed on the stock of American Airlines, Boeing and United Airlines. The opening montage intertwines clips of the collapse of the twin towers and building 7 with a Hunter S. Thompson interview, who talks about the motive, the public version of 9/11, and answered a question saying "Absolutely," that this worked in the favor of the Bush administration.

This is followed by an examination of the attacks on the Pentagon. The film opposes the official story of Flight 77 hitting the Pentagon, alleging that the path of destruction does not match what a 757 would leave. In particular it claims that the size of the hole in the Pentagon, a lack of debris, and little landscape damage seem inconsistent with prior airliner crashes. It also alleges that too few parts were recovered from the crash site to reliably ascertain that they were of a Boeing 757, and that a flywheel observed at the site seemed too small to have been part of the aircraft's engine turbine. Experts officially declared that the wheel was part of the APU, but others say it didn't come from the APU of a 757 but likely from an E-3 Sentry aircraft.

The film also claims that the alleged hijacker-pilot Hani Hanjour had difficulty operating basic controls on a small Cessna that he rented at a flight school, and that perhaps not even an experienced pilot could have maneuvered the reflex angle of turn at the airspeed and altitude at which the aircraft approached the Pentagon, without going into a high speed stall. The film mentions three cameras on nearby buildings that allegedly caught the entire incident at the Pentagon on film, which it says the government confiscated and has refused to release in full.

The next section focuses on the destruction of the World Trade Center. The film favors the controlled demolition theory of the destruction of World Trade Centers 1, 2 and 7. It cites as evidence eyewitness reports from a janitor, firemen, and other people near the buildings who heard bangs, many of them describing them as explosions as well as videotapes that show windows far below the burning floors blow out during the collapse, and seismograph results recorded during the collapse compared to the collapse of other similar buildings. The film falsely claims that WTC 1, 2 and 7 were the first steel frame buildings in history to collapse due to fire. Another allegation centers on an audio recording that the film claims contains two distinct explosions at the time of the impact. The film also posits that the official story of the collapse ignores the laws of physics.

In particular, the video alleges that the fires inside the twin towers were not hot enough to bring the buildings down. An audio tape is presented in which the Captain of Ladder 7 claims that the fires can be brought under control by two lines and it is mentioned that building 7 had taken only minor damage before its own collapse. These allegations follow a listing of buildings that burned longer than the Twin Towers and did not fall.

For Flight 93, the video ignores the reports of passengers crashing the plane to instead allege that it landed safely at Cleveland Hopkins International Airport where it was evacuated by government personnel into an unused NASA research center. As evidence, the film contains photographs and eyewitness reports of the crash site, media reports of a corresponding and bizarre evacuation at Cleveland Hopkins International Airport, oddities in the transcripts of cell-phone calls supposedly placed from the plane during the hijacking, and the sighting of the tail number of Flight 93 on an aircraft in use at a later date.

The film follows this with a miscellaneous listing of allegations. It claims that cell phone calls could not be made from American Airlines flights at the time of the crash—asking why American Airlines had to install a system in their own airplanes to allow the reception of cellular signals within the planes if they could do this regardless on September 11. It suggests that calls from passengers and crew were faked using sophisticated voice-morphing technology developed by the Los Alamos National Laboratory in New Mexico—and that the December 13, 2001, video of Osama bin Laden claiming responsibility for the attacks was also faked, featuring what appeared to be an overweight lookalike version of Bin Laden. Finally it alleges that of the list of hijackers the government initially released, many were not in the planes and therefore survived September 11, 2001, and may even still be alive.

In the end, the film gives financial motives for people it says would have benefited from launching the attacks. It first mentions Larry Silverstein, who supposedly stood to receive a substantial insurance payout after the attacks due to a fictional "anti-terrorism clause". It makes other allegations of insider trading and Halliburton's benefiting from the subsequent launch of America's "war on terror".

== Presentation and revisions ==
Although each version of the film asserts that the events of 9/11 were essentially an "inside job", there were significant revisions between the particular theories that different editions posited. For example:

=== Loose Change: 1st Edition (2005) ===
The first edition, Loose Change, suggested that there was an unusual device (which the filmmakers refer to as a "pod") under the fuselage of the plane that struck the South Tower of the World Trade Center. The "pod" was presented as evidence that the planes involved in the attack were replaced with remote-controlled drones. Another film 911: In Plane Site delves into the topic of the commercial airliners being military airliners with "pods". Official flight records were also presented as evidence that the aircraft involved are still in active service, though it is stated that the producers do not know what happened to the passengers of the flights. This information is omitted from all subsequent versions.

=== Loose Change: 2nd Edition Recut (2006) ===
Loose Change: 2nd Edition Recut is one hour and 29 minutes in length. The film consists of Dylan Avery narrating over photographs and news footage relating to 9/11, with an underscore of hip hop and other urban style music. Avery does not appear in the video itself, though he is shown in the bonus features. Video and still footage used includes considerable video content from CNN, MSNBC NBC, and Fox News, as well as a number of other sources.

- While the first edition asserted that United Airlines Flight 93 was shot down over Pennsylvania, Loose Change 2nd Edition and Loose Change 2nd Edition Recut theorize that Flight 93 was actually flown to and landed at Cleveland Hopkins Airport. The third edition states less information about Flight 93, but maintains that it is impossible that it crashed in Shanksville, Pennsylvania.

On May 26, 2006, a letter was sent to Avery alleging copyright and trademark infringement in Loose Change 2nd Edition resulting from the use of footage from French filmmakers the Naudet brothers. The letter states that Avery used copyrighted images from the film 9/11 and that those images violate the Lanham Act "by suggesting that the Naudet brothers or Mr. Hanlon have endorsed or sponsored the controversial views in your film." The letter concludes: "Accordingly, we hereby demand that you confirm to us within three (3) business days of the receipt of this letter that you have removed all footage taken from our clients' 9/11 film from your Loose Change film, including from the version of your film that can be downloaded on the Internet, the DVD version of your film and anywhere else you have used or are using our clients' footage." Avery announced that the recut version of the 2nd edition would omit some of the infringing material.

- The statement that New York's Empire State Building was hit by a B-52 bomber "sometime during the 1950s or 1960s" was corrected; the Empire State Building was hit by a much smaller plane, the twin-propeller B-25 Mitchell, in 1945.
- References to the rumors concerning the amount of gold stored beneath the World Trade Center (such as one claim of $167 billion in gold) were removed, leaving only confirmed statements, including that of the "$230 million in precious metals".
- The implication the film makes that Flight 77 had Pratt & Whitney engines made of steel and titanium alloy, was corrected; in fact the engines of Flight 77 were Rolls-Royce engines.
- Multiple instances of Wikipedia articles being shown as source material were removed and replaced with news articles containing the reported information.
- Throughout the film minor changes in talking points, images and language were made.

The end of the film shows a clip from The American Scholar's Symposium that was aired on C-SPAN on June 25, 2006, at the Sheraton Hotel in Los Angeles. Jason Bermas, wearing the signature "Investigate 9/11" T-shirt that he designed, is describing their plans to peacefully demonstrate at Ground Zero on September 11, 2006. The credits music was reMo Conscious' "We Know".

=== Loose Change: Final Cut (2007) ===
With new distributors, Loose Change: Final Cut was an attempt to remove all the speculative points from previous versions and weave the reported facts into this version. For instance, references that Flight 93 diverted to Cleveland Hopkins Airport, calls from the plane using voice-morphing technology, and the stance that a missile hit the Pentagon were removed from this version.

Avery asserted that this was the film he wanted to make due to the new information he found out later and due to the funding and distribution he was offered; in addition, with many firefighters, survivors and witnesses going to him about events of that day, he felt it was necessary to update the film. David Ray Griffin was a script consultant and radio host and conspiracy theorist Alex Jones was associated with the production of this film as well. This version was over two hours long, had a new musical score, and included additional interviews and new information that was not available in the prior versions.

The film was split up into the following acts and chapters:

- Prologue: focused on September 11, 2006, and the thousands of individuals who wore "Investigate 9/11" in New York.
- Act I / Chapter I: Hijackers.
- Act I / Chapter II: Wargames.
- Act II / Chapter I: Pentagon.
- Act II / Chapter II: Twin Towers.
- Act II / Chapter III: Shanksville.
- Act II / Chapter IV: WTC7.
- Act III: The 9/11 Commission.
- Epilogue: This talked about the Bush administration. The credits music of the film was reMo Conscious's "Loose Change".

=== Loose Change 9/11: An American Coup (2009) ===
Loose Change 9/11: An American Coup was the 2009 edition that was written, directed, and edited by Dylan Avery. Unlike the previous editions, this was narrated by actor Daniel Sunjata. Original music was composed by Mic Cartier and the music/score used in previous versions were not used. This version started with a history of false flag operations. The graphics, interviews, and footage were changed and updated. There were interviews with Steven Jones about the alleged nano-thermite residue found at the bottom of World Trade Centers 1, 2, and 7.

In addition, near the end of the film, there was an exclusive interview with Barry Jennings, an eyewitness who had been trapped in building 7, who claimed to have heard explosions and "stepped over people", and questioned why and how World Trade Center 7 was brought down. The film also notes the coincidence of Jennings' death occurring two days prior to the National Institute of Standards and Technology building 7 report release date, as well as the fact that Jennings' testimony contradicts the "official explanation" that there were no deaths or witnesses of explosions in building 7. It goes on to state that a private investigator was hired to investigate his death, which was prompted with a reply stating that the case was referred to the police, that a full refund is given, and to not email about that individual again.

The final segment of the film talked about former major general of the United States Marine Corps Smedley Butler and the Business Plot, which claims that wealthy businessmen backed by mainstream media and corporations approached him to overthrow then United States president Franklin D. Roosevelt and install a fascist regime.

The credits music was reMo Conscious's "Welcome to the Aftermath", which prominently features the verse "9/11 was an inside job".

=== Loose Change 9/11 (2015) ===
On December 15, 2015, Journeyman Pictures re-released Loose Change as a condensed, high-definition version of Loose Change 9/11: An American Coup. According to the producers Dylan Avery and Korey Rowe, this edition included the new released video by NIST, a new ending and a much shorter duration made for a digital platform.

=== Loose Change 2nd Edition: HD (2017) ===
On September 7, 2017, Loose Change 2nd Edition was released on YouTube via Loose Change's official YouTube channel. The movie was remastered into high-definition, graphics were updated, and new text was added to most of the movie. The audio from the original 2005 movie remained, however.

The credits music to this updated version of Loose Change was Remo Conscious's "Lies".

== Release and reception ==
In North America it aired on Fox TV affiliates, but received further screenings internationally. On September 10, 2006 BNN (Bart's Neverending Network) Nederland 3 and Portuguese public TV Station RTP aired Loose Change in prime time hours. RTP aired it again on 2: for September 17, 2006.

An August 2006 Vanity Fair article suggested that Loose Change "just might be the first Internet blockbuster." Millions more have viewed the film via unaffiliated websites. More than one million copies of the DVD have been sold, and many more have been given away.

The film has been broadcast on state media outlets in Belgium, Ireland and Portugal. According to Broadcast magazine, the video was to have a special screening at the UK Houses of Parliament on June 14, 2006. Michael Meacher, the British MP who had considered sponsoring the screening, decided against it. On September 11, 2006, Dylan Avery and Jason Bermas appeared on Democracy Now! the War and Peace Report, to debate with James Meigs and David Dunbar, two of the editors of Popular Mechanics and the book Debunking 9/11 Myths.

In November 2017 it was reported that a video file that was believed to be the second version of the film was found on Osama bin Laden's hard drives that were collected by U.S. Navy SEALs following the Killing of Osama bin Laden and a public declassification and release of some of its contents in 2017 by the CIA.

=== DVD releases ===
- Loose Change: 1st Edition Remastered DVD included bonus interviews and a feature on the Pentagon strike.
- Loose Change: 2nd Edition DVD included featurettes of Jason Bermas and the 9/11 Truth Movement in New York from 2005 handing out DVDs of Loose Change to others. A featurette showed the protesters at the United 93 premiere. A third featurette showed Avery, Bermas, and Rowe taping flyers of Loose Change in the city of New York.
- Loose Change: Final Cut DVD included reMo Conscious' music video "We Know" and a nine-minute deleted scene on the Pentagon strike.
- Loose Change 9/11: An American Coup DVD had interviews with narrator Daniel Sunjata, architect Richard Gage, and Jeannette McKinley (the woman who supplied World Trade Center dust samples to physicist Stephen Jones). In 2011, which was the ten year anniversary of 9/11, Loose Change 9/11: An American Coup included a 2nd limited edition disc that featured extended interviews, a documentary on the Loose Change phenomenon, stills gallery and more.

== Criticism ==
Journalists, researchers, social critics, as well as scientists and engineers have spoken out against the film's claims about the September 11 attacks.

Loose Change has been subject to criticism from a variety of sources. In March 2007, the United States Department of State published an article called "Loose Change Debunked" that says the movie makes "sloppy mistakes". The article is highly critical of the evidence cited to support the claim that Flight 77 did not hit the Pentagon, and it criticizes the controlled demolition hypothesis of the World Trade Center claiming that "demolition professionals say controlled demolition of the Towers that day would have been impossible." The article goes on to say:

It treats statements made at this time as if they represent reasoned judgments, not impromptu, often poorly thought-through misimpressions and uninformed speculation ... In sum, Loose Change is researched very shoddily, making numerous mistakes of fact and judgment. Nevertheless, this has not prevented it from becoming extraordinarily popular.

It also notes that Loose Change has also been criticized by other members of the 9/11 Truth Movement, referring specifically to the critique Sifting Through Loose Change. Michael Green, a member of the 9/11 Truth Movement, has analyzed the film and is critical of many of its claims and methods. Several independent researchers have also written critiques of the film. Noam Chomsky has argued that any scientists with plausible evidence would have gone through the traditional channels of scientific journals to convince other professionals, and that such a course of action is extremely low-risk for the scientist.

In May 2006, the blog Screw Loose Change was created to criticize the claims in the film. Another analysis of the film has been created by the Internet Detectives. Many of the critiques argue that Loose Change quote mines, uses unreliable or out-of-date sources, and cherry-picks evidence to claim that there are serious problems with official accounts of the events of September 11.

One of the many aspects these critiques focus on is Loose Change's analysis of the collapse of the World Trade Center. The comparison to other notable high-rise fires that did not lead to collapse ignores differences in building design, significant WTC structural damage, and compromised fireproofing, as most steel loses over half its strength at 600 °C (1,100 °F). The comparison with Madrid's Windsor Tower fails to note its steel-supported perimeter floors that collapsed during the fire. Kevin Ryan, described by Loose Change as working for Underwriters Laboratories (UL), was actually employed in a water-testing subsidiary. Furthermore, UL does not certify structural steel, and ASTM E119 certification is not meant to predict performance in real uncontrolled fires. The NIST found no evidence of any firm having conducted tests on WTC materials in the past. Another expert quoted, Van Romero, has clarified that he was misquoted by the Albuquerque Journal; he had actually said that it "looked like" explosives took down the WTC. When the misquote was printed, he felt his "scientific reputation was on the line."

On September 11, 2006, the public-TV network program Democracy Now! broadcast a discussion between two Loose Change creators and two editors from Popular Mechanics, where they debated at considerable length various aspects of the documentary. Jason Bermas claimed United Flight 93 did not crash into the field, and classified Popular Mechanics as a publication in the spirit of Hearst's yellow journalism.

George Monbiot, political activist and columnist for The Guardian, wrote an article on the improbability of the conspiracies cited in Loose Change, and then wrote a follow-up article in response to negative comments from some of his readers. On SModcast, Kevin Smith discussed Loose Change and other conspiracy videos about aliens and various things. However, he maintains that he enjoys the film purely as entertainment, and does not believe or agree with the theories presented in the film. The Best Page in the Universe parodied the movie with a short video, "Unfastened Coins", that "exposes" a Titanic-sinking conspiracy, and an article mocking the logic of conspiracy theories in the film. The History Channel aired a two-hour episode entitled "The 9/11 Conspiracies: Fact or Fiction?" featuring interviews with the creators of Loose Change. Mark Cuban, who was going to distribute the film, told the Dallas News "I don't believe the movie. Not at all." Financier Matthew Brown shared similar remarks though "supports free speech, even when I vehemently disagree."

In Britain, BBC's documentary television show The Conspiracy Files aired two documentaries focused on 9/11 and the conspiracy theories surrounding the collapse of WTC7. Several claims made by Loose Change were investigated and specifically rejected. Dylan Avery was interviewed for the program, which cast him in a negative light.

== In other media ==
In 2006, film director David Lynch was interviewed on Dutch television about Loose Change, to which he said that the film made him look at what he thought he saw, that he now had questions and "... no answers."

In his book American Conspiracies, specifically in Chapter 12 ("What Really Happened on September 11?"), former Governor of Minnesota Jesse Ventura wrote that he urged "everyone to see" the documentary Loose Change. The version Ventura saw was the 2007 (Final Cut) and he wrote that from the film, he was "amazed at the many firefighters and other eyewitnesses who talked about a whole series of explosions before and during the collapse of the buildings."

In 2011, film writer and director Kevin Smith stated that he "loved" Loose Change and said it was a compelling watch. In 2012, Smith said Loose Change was a "gripping, well-made film", "excellent filmmaking", but said he did not know if any of it was true.

== See also ==
- 9/11 Truth movement
- 9/11: Press for Truth
- Architects & Engineers for 9/11 Truth
- World Trade Center controlled demolition conspiracy theories
