= Nanofoundry =

Nanotechnology foundry

A nanofoundry is considered to be a foundry that performs on a scale similar to nanotechnology. This concept makes it similar to the role that the nanofactory would play because it is considered to be a factory that operates on that same scale model. The closest thing that nature has to a nanofoundry is the simple biological cell.

== Summary ==
=== General information ===
In silico biology attempts to duplicate nature by creating a virtual cell with the complete cycle of metabolism. The idea of creating an artificial cell along with working nanofoundries is highlighted in the phenomena of bioconvergence; which may advance us from the Information Age to the "Nanotechnology Age." Nanofoundries and artificial cells are creating a world where health care, the very definition of "medicine", along with life itself is entering a state of transition. This phenomenon is directly in parallel with changes in the procedures used in agriculture, managing our bioresources, ultimately leading up to the de facto equivalent of bio-engineering entire ecosystems from scratch.

As of 2011 the latest area of research involved using both micro- and nano-focused ion beams is found using nanomachining. Preliminary studies have indicated that tissues can be successfully grown on three-dimensional structures while using ion beams on a substrate.

On a larger scale, materials that appear to be smooth still have an abrasive appearance to them. Using the nanoscale, however, atoms rub off one a time. This creates new challenges for researchers who build their devices that are only 10 atoms wide.

=== Current progress ===
One of the first nanofoundries has been set up at the University of Madras in Chennai, Tamil Nadu, India. Knowledge about nanotechnology would be converted into useful consumer goods through the usage of nanofoundries. Scientists do not want nanotechnology to be confined to publishing research papers in journals when it could be useful for creating nanotechnology-enhanced consumer products that would be beneficial in our 21st century society. By converting the nanotechnology curriculum of the major universities into a more industry-oriented format, it makes the technology more practical for employers as well as consumers.

The ability to grow more complex structures with a high ratio allows for drug release devices, biosensors, nanoreactors, and other countless discoveries. During the following decades to come, researchers will scramble to construct the world's first nuclear nanobeam complex. This facility would offer state-of-the-art facilities to a wide range of disciplines; including the conventional sciences.

Commercial manufacturing could easily be scaled up thanks to nanofoundries. Nanofactories will most likely use metal nanoparticles instead of glass, plastic or rare earth minerals that are currently used to make most of our products.
