= World Trade Center controlled demolition conspiracy theories =

9/11 conspiracy theories

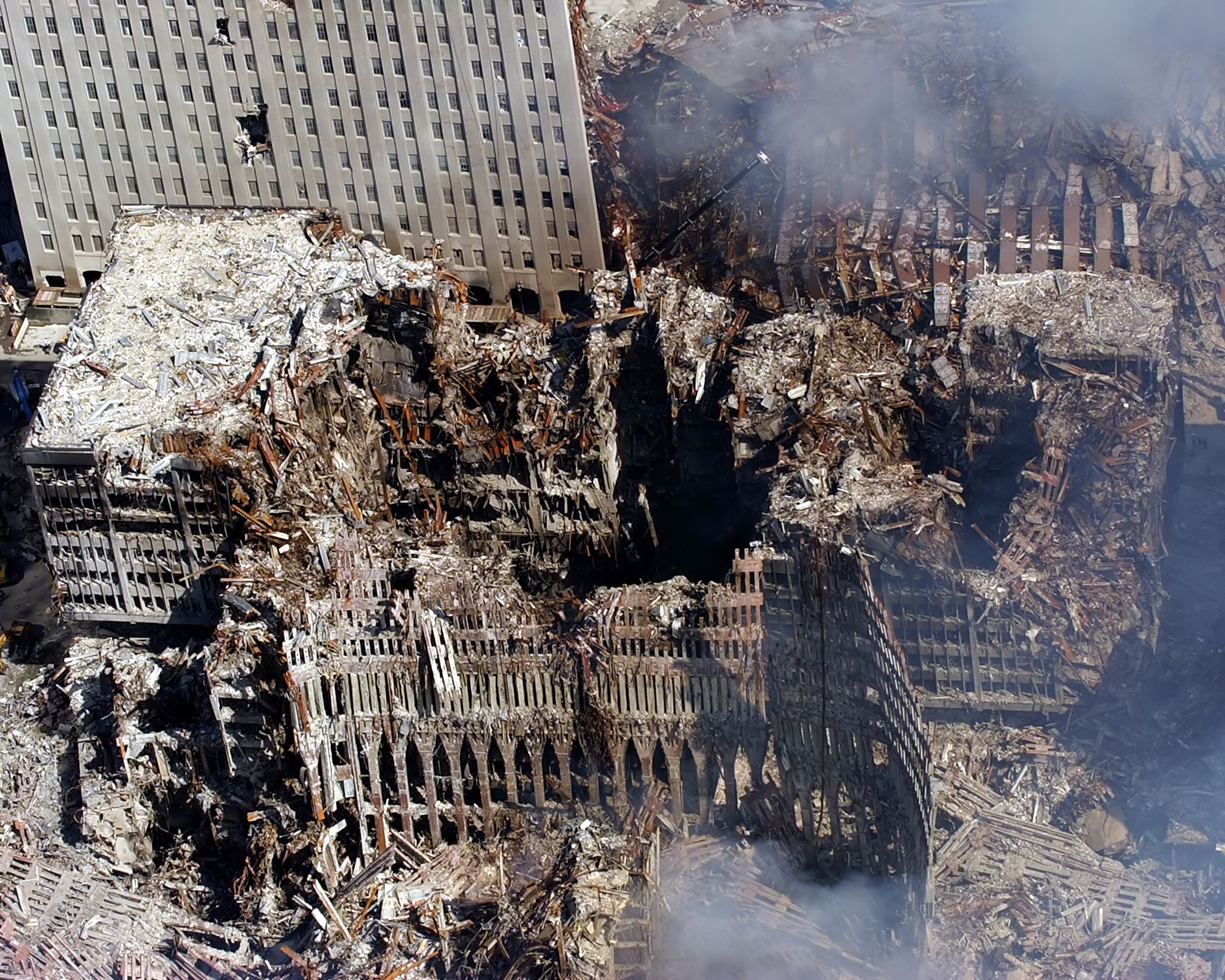
Aerial view of the debris field of the North Tower, 6 WTC, and 7 WTC (upper right). The damaged Verizon Building can be seen left of WTC 7's ruins.

Some conspiracy theories contend that the collapse of the World Trade Center was caused not solely by the airliner crash damage that occurred as part of the September 11 attacks and the resulting fire damage but also by explosives installed in the buildings in advance. Controlled demolition theories make up a major component of 9/11 conspiracy theories.

Early advocates such as physicist Steven E. Jones, architect Richard Gage, software engineer Jim Hoffman, and theologian David Ray Griffin proposed that the aircraft impacts and resulting fires themselves alone could not have weakened the buildings sufficiently to initiate the catastrophic collapse and that the buildings would have neither collapsed completely nor at the speeds they did without additional energy involved to weaken their structures.

The National Institute of Standards and Technology (NIST) and the magazine Popular Mechanics examined and rejected these theories. Specialists in structural mechanics and structural engineering accept the model of a fire-induced, gravity-driven collapse of the World Trade Center buildings, an explanation that does not involve the use of explosives. NIST "found no corroborating evidence for alternative hypotheses suggesting that the WTC towers were brought down by controlled demolition using explosives planted prior to Sept. 11, 2001." Professors Zdeněk Bažant of Northwestern University, Thomas Eagar of the Massachusetts Institute of Technology, and James Quintiere of the University of Maryland have also dismissed the controlled-demolition conspiracy theory.

In 2006, Jones suggested that thermite or super-thermite may have been used by government insiders with access to such materials and to the buildings themselves to demolish the buildings. In April 2009, Jones, Dane Niels H. Harrit and seven other authors published a paper in The Open Chemical Physics Journal, causing the editor, Prof. Marie-Paule Pileni, to resign as she accused the publisher of printing it without her knowledge; this article was titled Active Thermitic Material Discovered in Dust from the 9/11 World Trade Center Catastrophe, and stated that they had found evidence of nano-thermite in samples of the dust that was produced during the collapse of the World Trade Center towers. NIST responded that there was no "clear chain of custody" to prove that the four samples of dust came from the WTC site. Jones invited NIST to conduct its own studies using its own known "chain of custody" dust, but NIST did not investigate.

== History ==
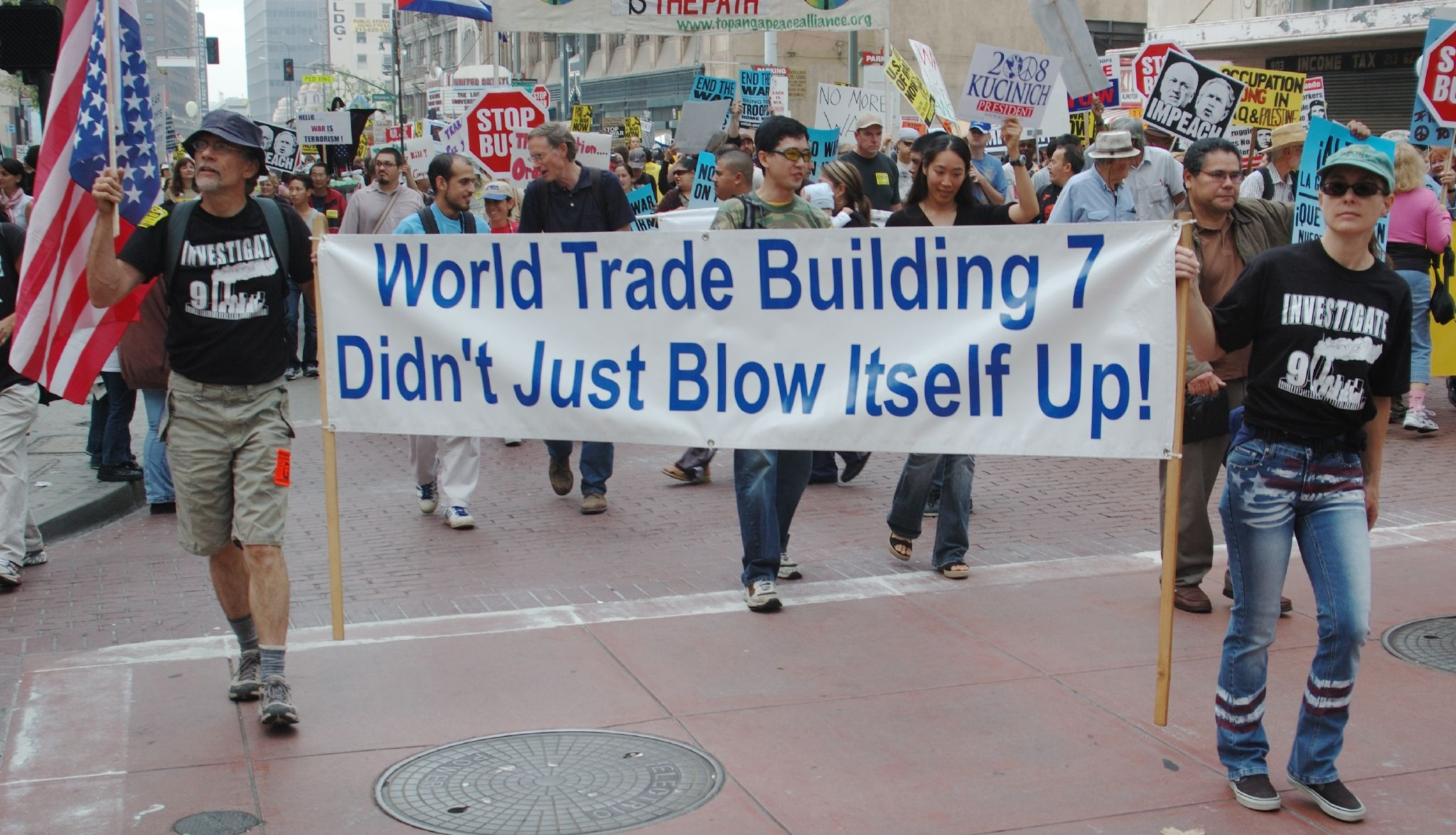
Supporters of the 9/11 Truth movement at an anti-war demonstration in Los Angeles, October 2007

The controlled demolition conspiracy theories were first suggested in September 2001. Eric Hufschmid's book, Painful Questions: An Analysis of the September 11th Attack, in which the controlled demolition theory is explicitly advocated, was published in September 2002. David Ray Griffin and Steven E. Jones are the best known advocates of the theory. Griffin's book The New Pearl Harbor, published in 2004, has become a reference work for the 9/11 Truth movement. In the same year, Griffin published the book The 9/11 Commission Report: Omissions and Distortions, in which he argues that flaws in the commission's report amounts to a cover-up by government officials and says that the Bush administration was complicit in the 9/11 attacks.

Steven E. Jones has been another voice of the proponents of demolition theories. In 2006, he published the paper "Why Indeed Did the WTC Buildings Completely Collapse?". On September 7, 2006, Brigham Young University placed Jones on paid leave citing the "increasingly speculative and accusatory nature" of his statements, pending an official review of his actions. Six weeks later, Jones retired from the university. The structural engineering faculty at the university issued a statement which said that they "do not support the hypotheses of Professor Jones".

In its final report, NIST stated that it "found no corroborating evidence for alternative hypotheses suggesting that the WTC towers were brought down by controlled demolition using explosives planted prior to Sept. 11, 2001. NIST also did not find any evidence that missiles were fired at or hit the towers. Instead, photographs and videos from several angles clearly show that the collapse initiated at the fire and impact floors and that the collapse progressed from the initiating floors downward until the dust clouds obscured the view" and posted an FAQ about related issues on its website in August 2006. Allegations of controlled demolition have been found to be devoid of scientific merit by mainstream engineering scholarship. The magazine Popular Mechanics also found the theories lacked scientific support in its special report "Debunking the 9/11 Myths".

Articles, letters and comments by controlled demolition advocates have been published in scientific and engineering journals. In April 2008, a letter titled "Fourteen Points of Agreement with Official Government Reports on the World Trade Center Destruction," was published by Steven E. Jones, Frank Legge, Kevin Ryan, Anthony Szamboti and James Gourley in The Open Civil Engineering Journal. A few months later, in July 2008, an article titled "Environmental anomalies at the World Trade Center: evidence for energetic materials," was published by Ryan, Gourley and Jones in the Environmentalist. Later that same year, in October 2008, the Journal of Engineering Mechanics published a comment by chemical engineer and attorney James R. Gourley, in which he describes what he considered fundamental errors in a 2007 paper on the mechanics of progressive collapse by Bažant and Verdure. In the same issue, Bažant and Le rebutted Gourley's arguments, finding his criticisms scientifically incorrect. They suggested future critics should "become acquainted with the relevant material from an appropriate textbook on structural mechanics" or risk "misleading and wrongly influencing the public with incorrect information."

In April 2009, Danish chemist Niels H. Harrit, of the University of Copenhagen, and eight other authors published a paper in The Open Chemical Physics Journal, titled, "Active Thermitic Material Discovered in Dust from the 9/11 World Trade Center Catastrophe." The paper concludes that chips consisting of unreacted and partially reacted super-thermite, or nano-thermite, appear to be present in samples of the dust. The editor in chief of the publication subsequently resigned.

Internet websites and videos have contributed to the growth of the movement of individuals supporting the theory that planted explosives destroyed the World Trade Center. The website of Architects and Engineers for 9/11 Truth cites the membership of over 2,400 architects and engineers. The controlled demolition theory often includes allegations that U.S. government insiders planned and / or participated in the destruction of the WTC in order to justify the invasion of Iraq and Afghanistan. The theory features prominently in popular entertainment type movies, such as Loose Change, as well as documentaries such as 9/11: Blueprint for Truth, by San Francisco-area architect Richard Gage.

While mainstream press has a significant history of dismissing conspiracy theories (i.e., in 2006, the magazine New York reported that a "new generation of conspiracy theorists is at work on a secret history of New York's most terrible day."), the theory has been supported by a number of popular actors, musicians and politicians, including Charlie Sheen, Willie Nelson, former Governor of Minnesota Jesse Ventura, talkshow host Rosie O'Donnell, and actors Ed Asner and Daniel Sunjata.

== Twin Towers ==
Illustration of the attack on the Twin Towers

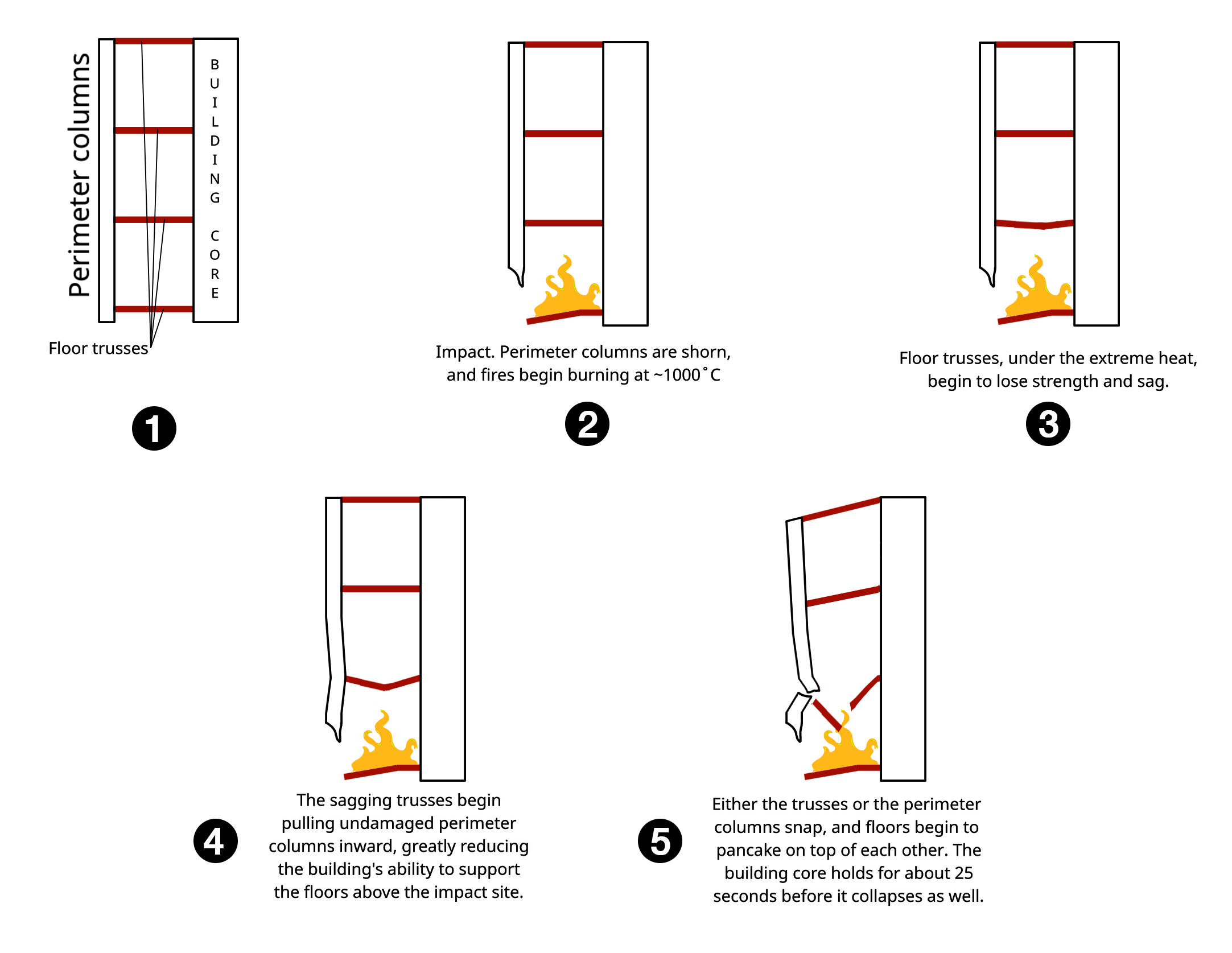
Diagram of the collapse of the North Tower

On September 11, the North Tower (1 WTC) was hit by American Airlines Flight 11 and the South Tower (2 WTC) was hit by United Airlines Flight 175, both Boeing 767 aircraft. The South Tower collapsed 56 minutes after the impact, and the North Tower collapsed 102 minutes after. An investigation by NIST concluded that the collapse was caused by a combination of damage to support columns and fire insulation from the aircraft impacts and the weakening of columns and floors by jet fuel ignited fires. NIST also found "no corroborating evidence for alternative hypotheses suggesting that the WTC towers were brought down by controlled demolition using explosives planted prior to September 11, 2001".

Jones, among others, points to many descriptions by individuals working on the WTC rubble pile suggesting the presence of molten steel in the pile and a stream of molten metal that poured out of the South Tower before it collapsed as evidence of temperatures beyond those produced by the fire. Jones has argued that the molten metal may have been elemental iron, a product of a thermite reaction. Jones and other researchers analyzed samples of dust from the World Trade Center buildings and reported their findings for evidence of nano-thermite in the dust. Jones informed NIST of his findings and NIST responded that there was no "clear chain of custody" proving that the dust indeed came from the WTC site. Jones invited NIST to conduct its own studies with dust under custody of NIST itself, but NIST has not done so.

NIST found that the condition of the steel in the wreckage of the towers does not provide conclusive information on the condition of the building before the collapse and concluded that the material coming from the South Tower was molten aluminum from the plane, which would have melted at lower temperatures than steel. NIST also pointed out that cutting through the vertical columns would require planting an enormous amount of explosives inconspicuously in highly secured buildings, then igniting it remotely while keeping it in contact with the columns. The Energetic Materials Research and Testing Center performed a test with conventional thermite and was unable to cut a vertical column, despite the column being much smaller than those used in the World Trade Center. Jones and others have responded that they do not believe that thermite was used, but rather a form of thermite called nano-thermite, a nanoenergetic material developed for military use, propellants, explosives, or pyrotechnics. Historically, explosive applications for traditional thermites have been limited by their relatively slow energy release rates. But because nano-thermites are created from reactant particles with proximities approaching the atomic scale, energy release rates are far improved.

The NIST report provides an analysis of the structural response of the building only up to the point where collapse begins, and asserts that the enormous kinetic energy transferred by the falling part of the building makes progressive collapse inevitable once an initial collapse occurs. A paper by Zdeněk Bažant indicates that once collapse began, the kinetic energy imparted by a falling upper section onto the floor below was an order of magnitude greater than that which the lower section could support.

The Twin Towers on 9/11, before and after their collapse

Engineers who have investigated the collapses generally agree that controlled demolition is not required to understand the structural response of the buildings. While the top of one of the towers did tilt significantly, it could not ultimately have fallen into the street, they argue, because any such tilting would place sufficient stress on the lower story (acting as a pivot) that it would collapse long before the top had sufficiently shifted its center of gravity. Indeed, they argue, there is very little difference between progressive collapse with or without explosives in terms of the resistance that the structures could provide after collapse began. Controlled demolition of a building to code requires weeks of preparation, including laying large quantities of explosive and cutting through beams, which would have rendered the building highly dangerous and which would have to be done without attracting the attention of the thousands of people who worked in the building. Controlled demolition is traditionally done from the bottom of buildings rather than the top, although there are exceptions depending on structural design. There is little dispute that the collapse started high up at the point where the aircraft struck. Furthermore, any explosives would have to withstand the impact of the airliners.

Members of the group Scholars for 9/11 Truth have collected eyewitness accounts of flashes and loud explosions immediately before the fall. Eyewitnesses have repeatedly reported of explosions happening before the collapse of the WTC towers, and the organization "International Center for 9/11 Studies" has published videos obtained from NIST, together with indications about when such explosions could be heard. There are many types of loud sharp noises that are not caused by explosives, and seismographic records of the collapse do not show evidence of explosions. Jones and others have argued that horizontal puffs of smoke seen during the collapse of the towers would indicate that the towers had been brought down by controlled explosions. NIST attributes these puffs to air pressure, created by the decreasing volume of the falling building above, traveling down elevator shafts and exiting from the open elevator shaft doors on lower levels.

In September 2011, Iranian president Mahmoud Ahmadinejad, who holds a PhD in Transportation Engineering and Planning, said that it would have been impossible for two jetliners to bring down the towers simply by hitting them and that some kind of planned explosion must have taken place. Al-Qaeda sharply criticized Ahmadinejad in their English-language publication, Inspire, calling his assertions "a ridiculous belief that stands in the face of all logic and evidence".

== 7 World Trade Center ==
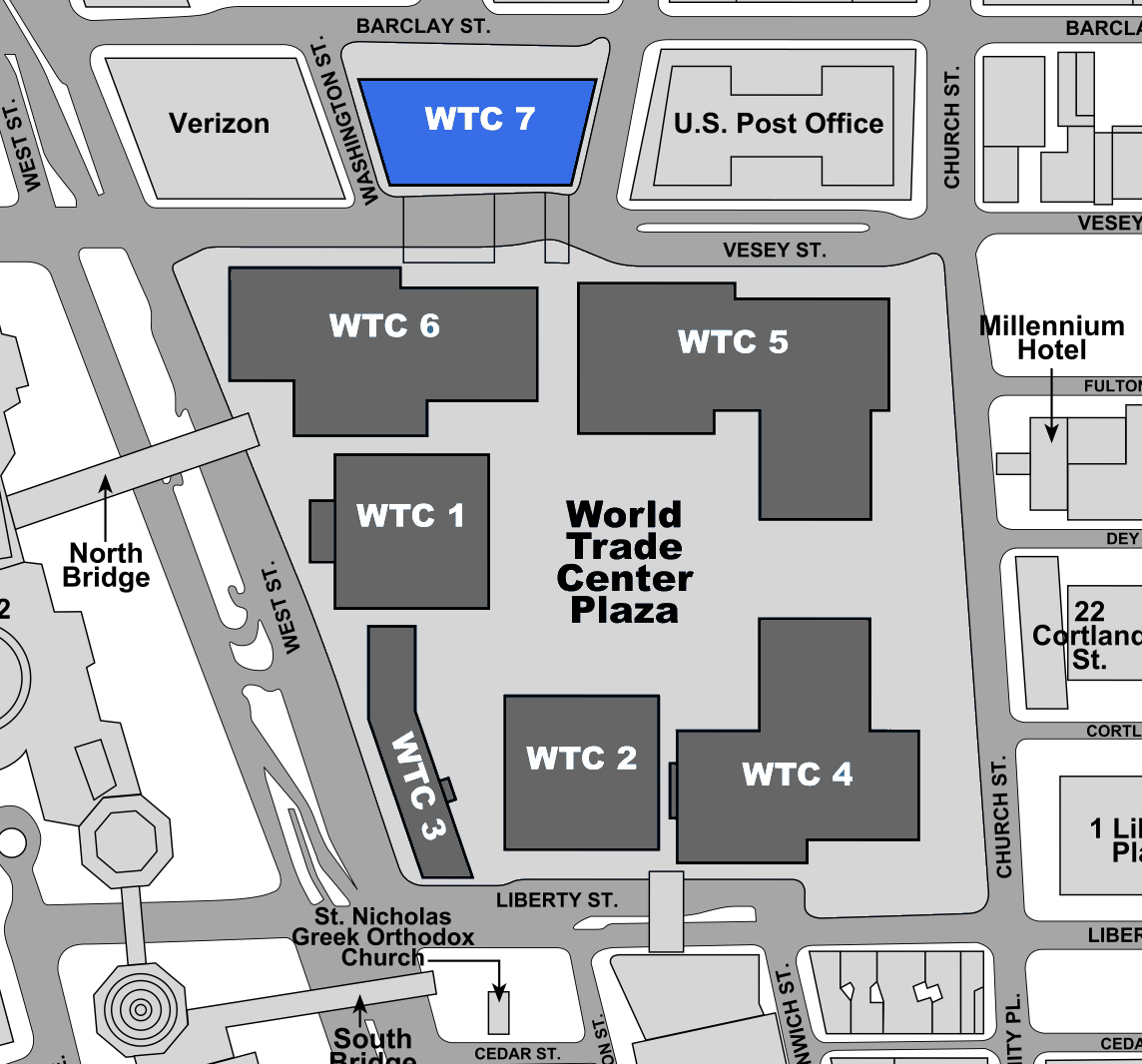
The position of 7 WTC in relation to the other WTC buildings. WTC 1, 2 and 7 collapsed on September 11, 2001.

Proponents of World Trade Center controlled demolition theories allege that 7 World Trade Center—a 47-story skyscraper that stood across Vesey Street north of the main part of the World Trade Center site—was intentionally destroyed with explosives. Unlike the Twin Towers, 7 World Trade Center was not hit by a plane. It was damaged by falling debris from the Twin Towers, which cut a large gash in its south side, and further damaged by fires which burned out of control for seven hours, until it collapsed at about 5:20 p.m. on September 11 (a new building has been erected on the site of the old and opened in May 2006). Several videos of the collapse event exist in the public domain, thus enabling comparative analysis from different angles of perspective. Proponents typically say the collapse of 7 World Trade Center was not mentioned in the 9/11 Commission Report and that the federal body charged with investigating the event, NIST, required seven years to conduct its investigation and issue a report.

In November 2010, Fox News reporter Geraldo Rivera hosted members of a television ad campaign called "BuildingWhat?", a series of commercials in which 9/11 family members ask questions about 7 World Trade Center and call for an investigation into its collapse. Rivera called the television ads "not so easy to dismiss as those demonstrators were," and stated that, "If explosives were involved, that would mean the most obnoxious protesters in recent years ... were right." Days later, Rivera appeared on the program Freedom Watch with legal analyst Judge Andrew Napolitano on the Fox Business Network to discuss the BuildingWhat? TV ad campaign. Napolitano stated, "It's hard for me to believe that [7 World Trade Center] came down by itself. I was gratified to see Geraldo Rivera investigating it."

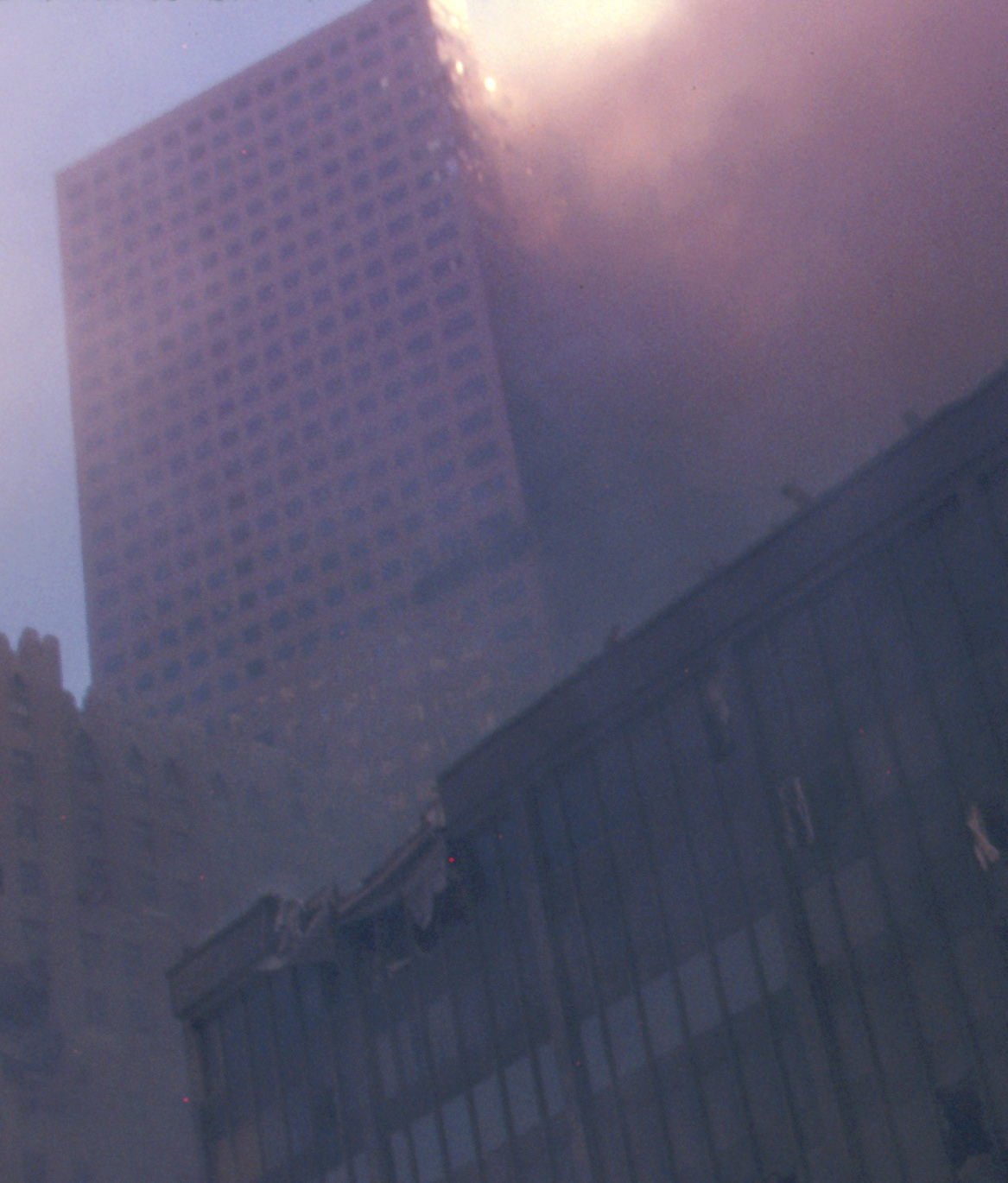
WTC7 on fire, with most of the damage hidden by smoke and other buildings

Some proponents of World Trade Center controlled demolition theories suggest that 7 WTC was demolished because it may have served as an operational center for the demolition of the Twin Towers, while others suggest that government insiders may have wanted to destroy key files held in the building pertaining to corporate fraud. The WTC buildings housed dozens of federal, state and local government agencies. According to a statement reported by the BBC, Loose Change film producer Dylan Avery thinks the destruction of the building was suspicious because it housed some unusual tenants, including a clandestine CIA office on the 25th floor, an outpost of the U.S. Secret Service, the Securities and Exchange Commission, and New York City's emergency command center. The former chief counter-terrorism adviser to the President, Richard Clarke, does not think that 7 WTC is mysterious, and said that anyone could have rented floor space in the building.

No other steel frame high rise had ever before collapsed because of a fire, although there have been previous cases of collapses or partial collapses of smaller steel buildings due to fire. However, the ability of such a building to be completely destroyed by fire would be demonstrated by the collapse of the Plasco Building in Tehran in 2017 and the Wilton Paes de Almeida Building in São Paulo, Brazil, the following year. In addition, NIST claims debris ejected during the collapse of 1 WTC caused significant structural damage in 7 WTC before the fire.

BBC News reported the collapse of 7 WTC twenty minutes before it actually fell. The BBC has stated that many news sources were reporting the imminent collapse of 7 WTC on the day of the attacks. Jane Standley, the reporter who announced the collapse prematurely, called it a "very small and very honest mistake" caused by her thinking on her feet after being confronted with a report she had no way of checking.

In the PBS documentary America Rebuilds, which aired in September 2002, Larry Silverstein, the owner of 7 WTC and leaseholder and insurance policy holder for the remainder of the WTC complex, recalled a discussion with the fire department in which doubts about containing the fires were expressed. Silverstein recalled saying, "We've had such terrible loss of life, maybe the smartest thing to do is pull it". "They made that decision to pull", he recalled, "and we watched the building collapse." Silverstein issued a statement that it was the firefighting team, not the building, that was to be pulled, contradicting theorists' allegation that "pull" was used in a demolition-related sense.

=== NIST report ===
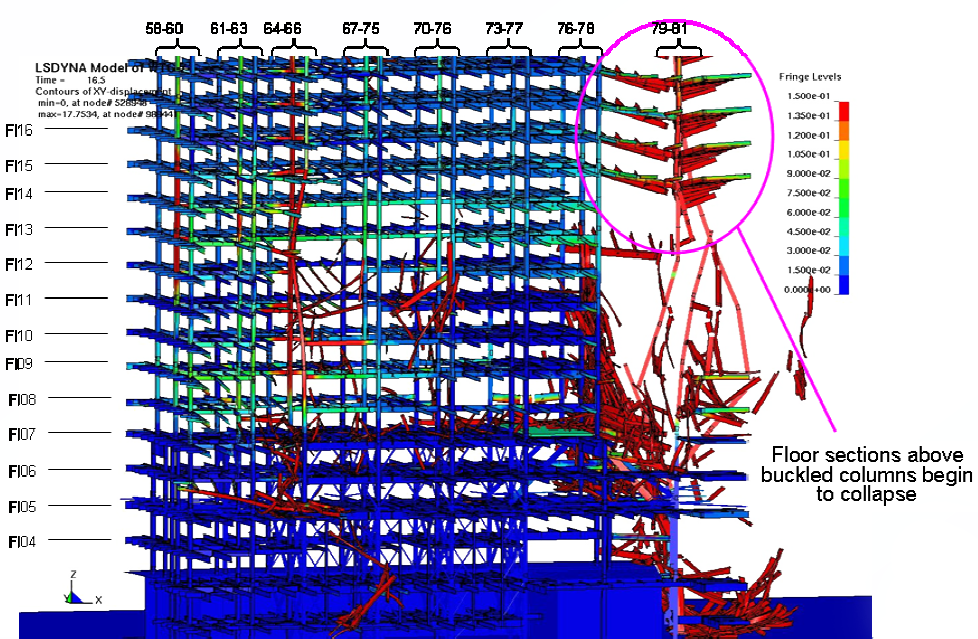
NIST simulation of the collapse of WTC7

In 2002, the National Institute of Standards and Technology (NIST) began a general investigation into the collapse of the World Trade Center but soon made a decision to focus first on the collapse of the Twin Towers. A draft version of its final report on the collapse of 7 WTC was released in August 2008. The agency has attributed the slowness of this investigation to the complexity of the computer model it used, which simulated the collapse from the moment it begins all the way to the ground; and NIST says the time taken on the investigation into 7 WTC is comparable to the time taken to investigate an aircraft crash. The agency also says another 80 boxes of documents related to 7 WTC were found and had to be analyzed. These delays fueled suspicion among those already questioning the validity of the September 11 attacks that the agency was struggling to come up with a plausible conclusion.

NIST released its final report on the collapse of 7 World Trade Center on November 20, 2008. Investigators used videos, photographs and building design documents to come to their conclusions. The investigation could not include physical evidence as the materials from the building lacked characteristics allowing them to be positively identified and were therefore disposed of prior to the initiation of the investigation. The report concluded that the building's collapse was due to the effects of the fires which burned for almost seven hours. The fatal blow to the building came when the 13th floor collapsed, weakening a critical steel support column that led to catastrophic failure, and extreme heat caused some steel beams to lose strength, causing further failures throughout the building until the entire structure succumbed. Also cited as a factor was the collapse of the nearby towers, which broke the city water main, leaving the sprinkler system in the bottom half of the building without water.

NIST considered the possibility that 7 WTC was brought down with explosives and concluded that a blast event did not occur, that the "use of thermite ... to sever columns in 7 WTC on 9/11/01 was unlikely". The investigation cited as evidence the claim that no blast was audible on recordings of the collapse and that no blast was reported by witnesses, stating that it would have been audible at a level of 130-140 decibels at a distance of half a mile. Demolition proponents say eyewitnesses repeatedly reported explosions happening before the collapse of the towers, and have published videos obtained from NIST, together with indications about when such explosions could be heard in support of the sounds of explosions before collapse.

NIST also concluded that it is unlikely that the quantities of thermite needed could have been carried into the building undetected. Demolition advocates have responded that they do not claim that thermite was used, but rather that nano-thermite, far more powerful than thermite, was used. Finally, the NIST investigated and ruled out the theory that fires from the large amount of diesel fuel stored in the building caused the collapse.

=== UAF study ===
University of Alaska Fairbanks (UAF) Professor of Civil Engineering J. Leroy Hulsey subsequently led a 4-year (2015–2019) investigation funded by Architects and Engineers for 9/11 Truth titled "A Structural Reevaluation of the Collapse of World Trade Center 7", taking advantage of the improvement in computing resources since NIST's study. The UAF provides a 256 GB downloadable file that contains "All input data, results data, and simulations that were used or generated during this study." Their conclusions were present in Hulsey's group final report:

The principal conclusion of our study is that fire did not cause the collapse of WTC 7 on 9/11, contrary to the conclusions of NIST and private engineering firms that studied the collapse. The secondary conclusion of our study is that the collapse of WTC 7 was a global failure involving the near-simultaneous failure of every column in the building.

— Hulsey JL, Quan Z, Xiao F, University of Alaska Fairbanks

Some other researchers have criticized their conclusions.

== Criticism ==
The American Society of Civil Engineers Structural Engineering Institute issued a statement calling for further discussion of NIST's recommendations, and Britain's Institution of Structural Engineers published a statement in May 2002 welcoming the FEMA report, noting that the report expressed similar views to those held by its group of professionals.

Following the publication of Jones' paper "Why Indeed Did the WTC Buildings Completely Collapse?" Brigham Young University responded to Jones' "increasingly speculative and accusatory" statements by placing him on paid leave, and thereby stripping him of two classes, in September 2006, pending a review of his statements and research. Six weeks later, Jones retired from the university. The structural engineering faculty at the university issued a statement which said that they "do not support the hypotheses of Professor Jones". On September 22, 2005, Jones gave a seminar on his hypotheses to a group of his colleagues from the Department of Physics and Astronomy at BYU. According to Jones, all but one of his colleagues agreed after the seminar that an investigation was in order and the lone dissenter came to agreement with Jones' suggestions the next day.

Northwestern University Professor of Civil Engineering Zdeněk Bažant, who was the first to offer a published peer-reviewed theory of the collapses, wrote "a few outsiders claiming a conspiracy with planted explosives" as an exception. Bažant and Verdure trace such "strange ideas" to a "mistaken impression" that safety margins in design would make the collapses impossible. One of the effects of a more detailed modeling of the progressive collapse, they say, could be to "dispel the myth of planted explosives". Indeed, Bažant and Verdure have proposed examining data from controlled demolitions in order to better model the progressive collapse of the towers, suggesting that progressive collapse and controlled demolition are not two separate modes of failure (as the controlled-demolition conspiracy theory assumes).

Thomas Eagar, a professor of materials science and engineering at the Massachusetts Institute of Technology, also dismissed the controlled-demolition conspiracy theory. Eagar remarked, "These people (in the 9/11 truth movement) use the 'reverse scientific method.' They determine what happened, throw out all the data that doesn't fit their conclusion, and then hail their findings as the only possible conclusion."

Regarding Jones' theory that nanothermite was used to bring down the towers, and the assertion that thermite and nanothermite composites were found in the dust and debris were found following the collapse of the three buildings, which was considered to be evidence that explosives brought down the buildings, Brent Blanchard, author of "A History of Explosive Demolition in America", states that questions about the viability of Jones' theories remain unanswered, such as the fact that no demolition personnel noticed any telltale signs of thermite during the eight months of debris removal following the towers' collapse. Blanchard also stated that a verifiable chain of possession needs to be established for the tested beams, which did not occur with the beams Jones tested, raising questions of whether the metal pieces tested could have been cut away from the debris pile with acetylene torches, shears, or other potentially contaminated equipment while on site, or exposed to trace amounts of thermite or other compounds while being handled, while in storage, or while being transferred from Ground Zero to memorial sites. Dave Thomas of Skeptical Inquirer magazine, noting that the residue in question was claimed to be thermitic because of its iron oxide and aluminum composition, pointed out that these substances are found in many items common to the towers. Thomas stated that in order to cut through a vertical steel beam, special high-temperature containment must be added to prevent the molten iron from dropping down, and that the thermite reaction is too slow for it to be practically used in building demolition. Thomas pointed out that when Jesse Ventura hired New Mexico Tech to conduct a demonstration showing nanothermite slicing through a large steel beam, the nanothermite produced copious flame and smoke but no damage to the beam, even though it was in a horizontal, and therefore optimal, position.

Preparing a building for a controlled demolition takes considerable time and effort. The tower walls would have had to be opened on dozens of floors. Thousands of pounds of explosives, fuses and ignition mechanisms would need to be sneaked past security and placed in the towers without the tens of thousands of people working in the World Trade Center noticing. Referring to a conversation with Stuart Vyse, a professor of psychology, an article in the Hartford Advocate asks, "How many hundreds of people would you need to acquire the explosives, plant them in the buildings, arrange for the airplanes to crash ... and, perhaps most implausibly of all, never breathe a single word of this conspiracy?"

World Trade Center developer Larry Silverstein said, "Hopefully this thorough report puts to rest the various 9/11 conspiracy theories, which dishonor the men and women who lost their lives on that terrible day." Upon presentation of the NIST's detailed report on the failure of Bldg. 7, Richard Gage, leader of the group Architects & Engineers for 9/11 Truth said, "How much longer do we have to endure the coverup of how Building 7 was destroyed?" in which Dr. S. Shyam Sunder, the lead NIST investigator said he could not explain why the skepticism would not die. "I am really not a psychologist," he said. "Our job was to come up with the best science." James Quintiere, professor of fire protection engineering at the University of Maryland, who does not believe explosives brought down the towers, questioned how the agency came to its conclusions, remarking, "They don't have the expertise on explosives," though he added that NIST wasted time employing outside experts to consider it.
