= Architects & Engineers for 9/11 Truth =

Conspiracy theory organization

Architects & Engineers for 9/11 Truth, Inc.
- Founded: November 13, 2007
- Founder: Richard Gage
- Type: Nonprofit corporation with 501(c)(3) tax exemption
- Purpose: 9/11 truth movement Promoting the World Trade Center controlled demolition conspiracy theory
- Location: Lafayette, California, U.S.
- Region served: United States
- Members: 4 board members, 1 staff members
- Website: www.ae911truth.org

Architects & Engineers for 9/11 Truth, Inc. (AE911Truth) is an American non-profit organization promoting the conspiracy theory that the World Trade Center was destroyed in a controlled demolition, disputing accepted conclusions around the September 11 attacks, including the 9/11 Commission Report, as well as FEMA's "WTC Building Performance Study" (2002). Their claims and theories lack support among the relevant professional communities.

== Activities ==
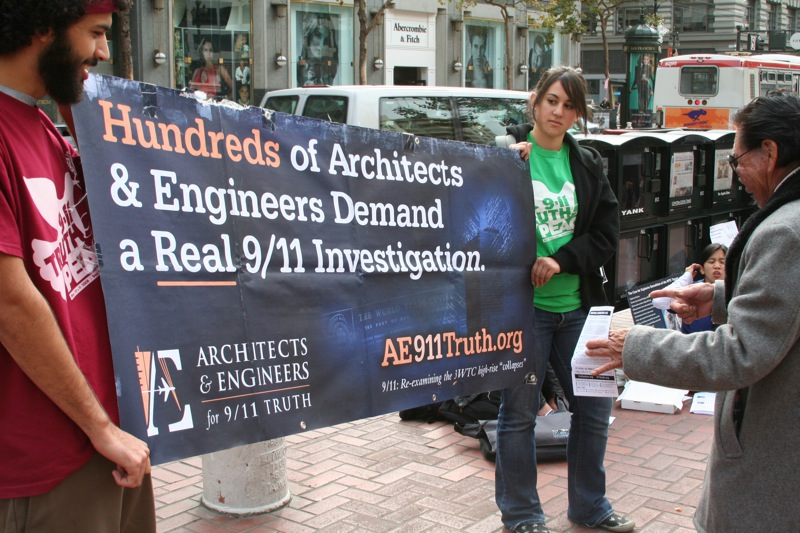
Two people holding a banner of Architects & Engineers for 9/11 Truth

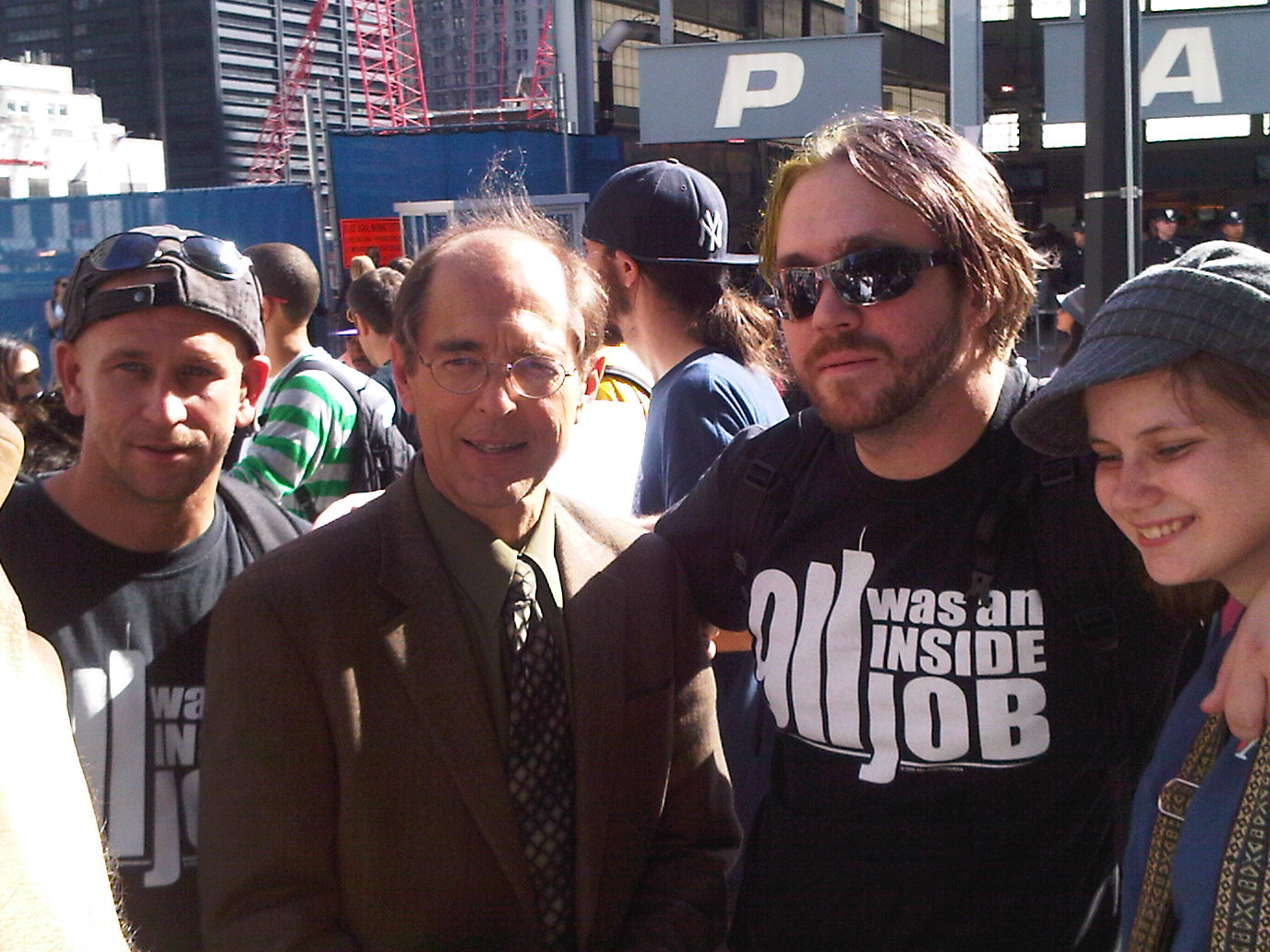
Richard Gage (second from left) with 9/11 truth activists at the World Trade Center in New York on September 11, 2010

Richard Gage, a San Francisco Bay Area architect, founded Architects & Engineers for 9/11 Truth in 2006. Gage's website states that he is a member of the American Institute of Architects and that he worked as an architect for 20 years and was involved in the construction of numerous "fireproof" steel-frame buildings. He became convinced of the need to create an organization that brings together architects and engineers after listening to an independent radio station interview with theologian David Ray Griffin.

Gage has given speeches at conferences organized by supporters of the 9/11 truth movement in various locations in the United States and Canada, and has presented his multimedia talk "9/11 Blueprint for Truth – The Architecture of Destruction" in 14 countries. His presentations focus on the sequence of events leading to the destruction of the three World Trade Center buildings and include videos of their collapses alongside footage of controlled demolitions. He went on a tour of European countries in 2008 and gave speeches in Australia, New Zealand and Japan in 2009. In 2009, Architects & Engineers for 9/11 Truth had a booth at the annual convention of the American Institute of Architects. AIA media relations director Scott Frank has stated that "We don't have any relationship with his organization whatsoever."

The controversial two-hour movie 9/11 Blueprint for Truth, popular among members of the 9/11 Truth movement, is based on a presentation given by Richard Gage in Canada. Gage was also interviewed for an episode of the BBC television program The Conspiracy Files, an episode of the ZDF's series History, based on a co-production of the BBC and the ZDF, as well as for a documentary produced by the Canadian television news magazine The Fifth Estate.

The organization is the main constituent of the ReThink911 coalition, which ran an advertising campaign putting up signs and billboards in seven U.S. cities, as well as in Vancouver, Toronto, London, and Sydney in 2013.

Gage left Architects & Engineers for 9/11 Truth in September 2021, after being criticised for remarks he made suggesting vaccines were poisonous and allegations of antisemitism.

== Advocacy ==
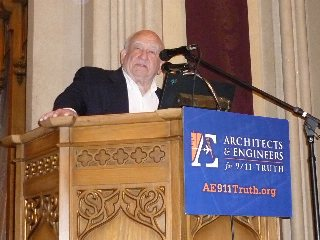
Ed Asner speaking in support of Richard Gage and Architects & Engineers for 9/11 Truth at an event in Los Angeles

Members of the organization argue that the buildings of the World Trade Center could not have collapsed only because of the impact of the planes, or as a result of the fires that had been caused by them. On the one hand Gage has said that avoiding speculation on the attacks on the Pentagon or on the involvement of the Bush administration is critical to the mission of the organization. But on the other hand, Gage has said that if the destruction of the World Trade Center was the result of a controlled demolition, this would mean that part of what happened on September 11, 2001, would have been planned by "some sort of an inside group". According to Gage, an elevator modernization program that had taken place before the attacks would have provided an opportunity to get access to the core areas of the WTC towers without creating suspicion.

Investigations by the Federal Emergency Management Agency and the National Institute of Standards and Technology (NIST) have concluded that the buildings collapsed as a result of the impacts of the planes and of the fires that resulted from them. In 2005, a report from NIST concluded that the destruction of the World Trade Center towers was the result of progressive collapse initiated by the jet impacts and the resultant fires. A 2008 NIST report described a similar progressive collapse as the cause of the destruction of the third tallest building located at the World Trade Center site, the 7 World Trade Center. Many mainstream scientists choose not to debate proponents of 9/11 conspiracy theories, saying they do not want to lend them unwarranted credibility. The NIST explanations of the collapses are universally accepted by the structural-engineering and structural-mechanics research communities.

=== World Trade Center towers ===
Gage criticized NIST for not having investigated the complete sequence of the collapse of the World Trade Center towers, and claims that "the official explanation of the total destruction of the World Trade Center skyscrapers has explicitly failed to address the massive evidence for explosive demolition." In particular, Gage argues that the buildings of the World Trade Center could not have collapsed at the speed that has been observed without tearing apart several columns of their structures with the help of explosives. To support its position, Architects & Engineers for 9/11 Truth points to the "free fall" acceleration of 7 WTC during part of the collapse, to "lateral ejection of steel," and to "mid-air pulverization of concrete." Gage also said that the absence of "large gradual deformations" associated with the collapse would indicate that the buildings have been destroyed by controlled demolition. That the three buildings of the World Trade Center "fell through what should have been the path of greatest resistance" would, according to the organization, require "precisely timed removal of critical columns, which office fires cannot accomplish". As the mass of the top of the North Tower had been blown outward during the collapse, there was "nothing left to drive this building to the ground," Gage says.

Gage maintains that the "sudden and spontaneous" collapse of the towers would have been impossible without a controlled demolition, that pools of molten iron found in the debris of the buildings were evidence of the existence of thermite, and that researchers had found unignited nano-thermite in the dust produced by the collapse of the World Trade Center. Gage argues that this material "is not made in a cave in Afghanistan". Iron-rich micro-spheres, which, according to the organization, have been found in the dust of the World Trade Center buildings by independent laboratory analyses, would indicate temperatures during the collapses much higher than temperatures that would result from hydrocarbon fires. A DVD produced by the group contains eyewitness accounts of claimed explosions and flashes seen in the buildings.

In 2008, Zdeněk P. Bažant, professor of civil engineering and materials science at Northwestern University, published with three coauthors a paper to examine whether allegations of controlled demolition might be scientifically justifiable. They found that the available video records are not consistent with the free fall hypothesis, that the size of the concrete particles is consistent with comminution caused by impact, and that the high velocity of compressed air explains why material from the towers were ejected to a distance of several hundred meters from the tower. The authors conclude that the allegations of controlled demolition do not have any scientific merit. A spokesman for NIST said that any sightings of molten metal, including metal seen pouring from the South Tower, were likely molten aluminum from the airplane, an explanation disputed by Gage who stated that the color of the molten metal rules out aluminum. "Basically, gravity and the utter force of the upper floors forced the towers down," said NIST spokesperson Michael Newman.

=== 7 World Trade Center ===
According to Richard Gage, 7 World Trade Center (7 WTC), a 47-story high-rise building that was part of the World Trade Center complex and collapsed in the afternoon on September 11, 2001, is the "smoking gun" of September 11, providing the most compelling evidence that something was suspect about the building's collapse that had not been told to the public. Gage also described 7 WTC as "the most obvious example of controlled demolition." According to Gage, the only way to bring a building down with free-fall acceleration would be to remove its columns, which provide resistance to the force of gravity. Scott Grainger, a fire protection engineer and member of the group, told the BBC that the evidence he had seen indicated the fires in 7 WTC were scattered about on the floors and would have moved on as they would have found no more combustibles. He thus claims that the fires could not have developed enough heat to cause the collapse of the building.

Gage dismisses the explanation of the collapse of 7 World Trade Center given by the National Institute of Standards and Technology (NIST), according to which uncontrolled fires and the buckling of a critical support column caused the collapse, and argues that this would not have led to the uniform way the building actually collapsed. "The rest of the columns could not have been destroyed sequentially so fast to bring this building straight down into its own footprint," he says. Gage argues that skyscrapers that have suffered "hotter, longer lasting and larger fires" have not collapsed. "Buildings that fall in natural processes fall to the path of least resistance," says Gage, "they don't go straight down through themselves." Architects & Engineers for 9/11 Truth also questions the computer models used by NIST, and argues that evidence pointing to the use of explosives had been omitted in its report on the collapse of 7 WTC.

The community of experts in structural mechanics and structural engineering generally supports the explanation of the collapse of the World Trade Center buildings provided by the investigation conducted by NIST. In the case of 7 WTC, the appearance of a controlled demolition can be explained by an interior failure of the building, which is suggested by the sequence of the collapse of 7 WTC that shows roof elements sinking into the building while the façade remained intact.

=== Criticism of the official investigations ===
Architects & Engineers for 9/11 Truth has expressed concerns that evidence related to the destruction of the World Trade Center could have been distorted and covered up by the National Institute of Standards and Technology (NIST), which conducted a building and fire safety investigation, one of the official investigations into the event. According to the group, and NIST themselves (who considered it unnecessary), NIST did not look for physical evidence of explosives, and did not include the eyewitness accounts from first responders and from people who escaped the buildings in their investigation. The organization also alleges that much of the physical evidence, apart from a few selected samples of the steel, would have been destroyed. Gage says that taped eyewitness interviews that were released to The New York Times in August 2005 had been "hidden by the city of New York".

After the publication of the results of NIST's inquiry into the collapse of 7 WTC, Gage called a news conference, and leaders of Architects & Engineers for 9/11 Truth dismissed NIST's investigation as flawed. When told of the claims, Shyam Sunder, lead investigator from NIST, responded: "I am really not a psychologist. Our job was to come up with the best science." A spokesperson for NIST said the agency's computer models were highly reliable in assessing the amount of fireproofing dislodged, a factor that would not be present in other steel buildings cited by Gage.
