= 911: In Plane Site =

- DVD cover art
- Directed by: William Lewis
- Written by: Dave von Kleist
- Produced by: Dave von Kleist, William Lewis
- Production company: Power Hour Productions
- Distributed by: BridgeStoneMediaGroup.com
- Release date: 2004
- Running time: 1 hour, 12 minutes (director's cut)
- Country: United States
- Language: English

911: In Plane Site: Director's Cut is a 2004 film which promotes 9/11 conspiracy theories. Photographs and video footage from the September 11 attacks are presented and claims that the public was not given all of the facts surrounding the terrorist attack. It was directed by William Lewis.

== Claims ==
The films ask a series of leading questions about 9/11 conspiracy theories. Despite the film's assertions that "a jetliner is too large to fit into the hole made in The Pentagon," others have refuted this claim by showing that a hole of over 90 feet (27 m) in width was made on the first floor. Films such as In Plane Site and Loose Change only refer to the smaller hole on the second floor.

== Reviews ==
A short review in The Portland Mercury says of In Plane Site, "it features both an exceedingly annoying crackpot theorist and outlandish, unsubstantiated allegations about blurrily pixelized photos that don't really show anything".

Another review at Heraldextra.com states, "Nor does the presentation explain, if the attack planes were military, what happened to the commercial planes. It hints that they might have been shot down over the ocean. The trouble is that they weren't necessarily over the ocean. And who remembers an Atlantic crash of an airliner where debris such as luggage did not wash up all up and down the Eastern seaboard? If airliners went down in the sea, the secret could not have been kept for long. It's fine to be entertained by this stuff, even if it is a bit morbid. But let's not lose our senses."

== Television coverage ==
- September 9, 2006 – Broadcast on Australian television station Channel Ten. Broadcast resulted in complaints from MP Michael Danby.

== See also ==
- American Airlines Flight 11
- United Airlines Flight 175
- American Airlines Flight 77
- United Airlines Flight 93
