= The Conspiracy Files =

- Country of origin: United Kingdom
- No. of episodes: 13

Original release
- Network: BBC Two
- Release: 2006 – 2018

The Conspiracy Files is a British documentary television series broadcast on BBC Two, investigating various modern-day conspiracy theories. So far in two series and 13 programmes, the show has investigated the theories surrounding the September 11 attacks (twice), the Pan Am Flight 103 bomb, the Oklahoma City bombing, the 7 July 2005 London bombings, the deaths of David Kelly and Diana, Princess of Wales, Malaysia Airlines Flight 17, and those promoted by Donald Trump. Conspiracy theorist Alex Jones makes appearances in two episodes about 9/11 conspiracy theories.

== Episodes ==
Title	Subject	Broadcast	Page
How Diana Died	Theories about the death of Diana, Princess of Wales, the British Royal who died in a car crash in Paris, France, having been divorced from the future King and allegedly planning to marry Dodi Fayed, also killed in the crash	10 December 2006	
9/11	Theories about the September 11 attacks (9/11) in which terrorists attacked the World Trade Center in Manhattan, New York, and The Pentagon in Virginia with commercial planes, and brought down United Airlines Flight 93 in a further attempted attack	18 February 2007	
David Kelly	Theories about the death (later investigated by the Hutton Inquiry) of British UN weapons inspector David Kelly, who committed suicide shortly after being revealed as the source of leaks to BBC journalist Andrew Gilligan about the accuracy of the 'September Dossier', a British Government intelligence report used as justification for the 2003 invasion of Iraq	25 February 2007	
Oklahoma Bomb	Theories about the Oklahoma City bombing, in which Timothy McVeigh and Terry Nichols blew up a government building in Oklahoma City using a truck bomb, and for which McVeigh was executed and Nichols given multiple life sentences	4 March 2007	
9/11 – The Third Tower	Theories about the collapse of 7 World Trade Center, which was the third tower of the World Trade Center in Manhattan to collapse after the September 11 attacks (9/11), in which the tower collapsed after a fire, some hours after the main Twin Towers had collapsed	6 July 2008	
Lockerbie	Theories about the bombing of Pan Am Flight 103, which crashed in Lockerbie, Scotland on a flight from London Heathrow to New York JFK after a bomb was planted in the cargo hold, which later saw the implication and conviction of a Libyan intelligence agent, Abdelbaset al-Megrahi	31 August 2008	
7/7	Theories about the 7 July 2005 London bombings (7/7), in which four British Muslims carried out suicide bomb attacks on three London Underground trains and a Stagecoach London bus	30 June 2009	
Osama Bin Laden – Dead or Alive?	Examining what has happened to the world's most wanted man, Osama bin Laden. Despite one of the biggest manhunts in history, Osama Bin Laden remains as elusive as ever.	9 January 2010	
9/11 Ten years on	Ten years after the September 11 attacks (9/11) in which terrorists attacked the World Trade Center in Manhattan, New York, and The Pentagon in Virginia with commercial planes, and brought down United Airlines Flight 93, the programmes ask why the conspiracy Theories about the attacks still remain.	28 August 2011	
Who Shot Down MH17?		3 May 2016	
The Trump Dossier		3 November 2016	
Murder in Washington		1 April 2018	
