= Marie-Paule Pileni =

French physical chemist

Marie-Paule Pileni is a French physical chemist who was born in Tananarive, Madagascar. She is an Emeritus Professor at Sorbonne University. She is a Senior Member (since 1999), and previous administrator (2004–2011) of, the Institut Universitaire de France.

== Scientific achievements ==
Professor Pileni’s research has been interdisciplinary over her entire scientific career. Her accomplishments have contributed to several advancements in nanotechnology. She contributed to find new physics, chemistry and energy release out of the various nanostructures she developed. Her discoveries over the past thirty years provide various long-term fundamental and technological advances in biomedicine, solar energy or chip design.

She developed the use of colloids as nanoreactor to control inorganic nanocrystals growth processes and to assemble atoms in order to produce nanocrystals with various size and shapes. She demonstrated that nanoreactors can be used to modify chemically macromolecules such as proteins and enzymes opening a new approach to enzyme catalysis.

In addition, she showed that incompressible nanocrystals and coating agents, acting like mechanical springs holding together the nanoreactor, replace atoms and atomic bonds respectively in atomic crystals. She highlighted that collective chemical and physical intrinsic properties emerge from such 3D superlattices called colloid crystals or supracrystals. Some of them are in prefect alignment with atomic crystals.

Moreover, she discovered that the crystalline structure of nanocrystals plays a major role on the chemical and physical properties of both nanocrystals and their assemblies. Such suprastructures dispersed in aqueous solution operate as efficient universal "nanoheaters", a brand-new concept she introduced.

Such control of thermal energy release is one of the major challenges in various research areas related to energy release. She successfully self-assembles nanocrystals in tumor cells. Furthermore, such suprastructures target different compartments of the tumor microenvironment and trigger local photothermal damages that are inaccessible for isolated nanocrystals and not predicted by global temperature measurements.

She has always been sensitive to women in science careers. She trained more than a hundred scientists from all over the world (USA, Asia, Europe), half being women. From 2005 to 2007, she was Vice-President of the Women in Science Committee reporting to the French Minister of Research.

== Education and career ==
She is the daughter of Christophe Pileni, Administrator in Chief of the École nationale de la France d'Outre-Mer, and of Marie-Pasquine Micheletti, President of the French Red Cross. She studied, from 1961 to 1966, at the Maison d'éducation de la Légion d'honneur (school for children of Légion d’Honneur members), then at the Université Pierre et Marie Curie (1967–1969) and at the Université Paris-Sud 11 (1970–1972). There she obtained a honors degree in physical chemistry (1968), a Ph.D (1969) and a D.Sc. (thèse du doctorat d’Etat) (1977).

She became a demonstrator (1969–1974), assistant lecturer (1974–1983), associate professor (1983–1990), full professor (1990–1997), and finally distinguished professor (since 1997). She was director, between 1996 and 2000, of the Structure and Reactivity of Interfaces Laboratory (SRI), a Université Pierre et Marie Curie - Centre national de la recherche scientifique (CNRS) joint unit. Since 2004, she has been a professor at the Georgia Institute of Technology at Atlanta. In 2000, she created the Laboratoire des Matériaux Mésoscopiques et Nanométriques (LM2N) (Mesoscopic and Nanometric Materials Laboratory).

Along with her research work, she became administrator (2004–2010) of the Institut Universitaire de France IUF (as stated above). Moreover, she was Auditor (1987–88) of the Institut des Hautes Etudes de Défense Nationale, Auditor (1989) of the Institut des Hautes Etudes de Défense Européenne (European Defense Advanced Studies Institute) and Auditor (1990–91) of the Institut des Hautes Etudes de Sécurité Intérieure (Internal Security Advanced Studies Institute) (IHESI now INHESJ).

== Scientific honors and awards ==
- 2000: Langmuir Prize of the American Chemical Society.
- 2001: French citation laureate, Institute for Scientific Information. Award for most cited French scientist between 1981 and 1998.
- 2001: Lecture Award of Chemical Society of Japan, Division of Colloids and Surface Science.
- 2002: Doctorate honoris causa of the Chalmers University of Technology.
- 2003: Gay-Lussac Humboldt Prize, Germany.
- Since 2003: Member of the European Academy of Sciences.
- 2004: Descartes-Huygens Prize of the Royal Netherlands Academy of Arts and Sciences.
- Since 2004: Member of the Royal Swedish Academy of Engineering Sciences.
- 2005: Blaise Pascal Medal of the European Academy of Science.
- 2006: Lecture for Marie Curie 100 years anniversary.
- 2006: Emilia Valori Prize of the French Academy of Sciences.
- Since 2009: Fellow of the Royal Society of Chemistry in the United Kingdom.
- Since 2010: Member of the Academia Europaea.
- 2011: Member of AcademiaNet.
- 2011: Research Grants from the European Research Council.
- 2011: Catalán-Sabatier Lectureship award from the Spanish Royal Society of Chemistry
- 2012: Foreign member of The Royal Society of Arts and Sciences in Gothenburg.
- 2014: Journal Colloid Interface Science, JCIS, Life Achievement Award.
- 2015: Honorary Holmberg Lecture Chalmers University of Technology
- 2016: Pierre Süe award, from the French Chemical Society
- 2017: Franco-American Lectureship prize from the American Chemical Society and French Chemical Society
- 2021: Marie-Paule Pileni Festschrift- The Journal of Physical Chemistry

== Other honors ==
- 2012-2014: Member of the council scientific of Defense.
- 2013: Commandeur dans l’Ordre National du Mérite.
- 2017: Commandeur dans l'Ordre National de la Légion d’Honneur.

== Major publications ==
- Reverse micelles as hosts for proteins and small molecules; P.P. Luisi, M. Giomini, M.P. Pileni, B. Robinson; Biochem. Biophys. Acta. 947, 209–216, (1988).
- Reverse micelles : a microreactors; M.P. Pileni; J. Phys.Chem. 97, 6961-6974 (1993).
- Nanosized Particles Made in Colloidal Assemblies; M.P. Pileni; Langmuir 13, 3266-3276 (1997).
- Nanocrystals self assemblies: fabrication and collective properties; M.P. Pileni; J. Phys. Chem. 105, 3358-3372 (2001).
- Mesostructured Fluids in oil rich regions: Structural and templating approaches; M.P. Pileni; Langmuir 17, 7476-7487 (2001).
- Role of soft colloidal templates in the control of size and shape of inorganic nanocrystals; M.P. Pileni; Nature Materials 2, 145-150 (2003).
- Control of the size and shape of inorganic nanocrystals at various scales from nano to macrodomains; M.P. Pileni; J. Phys. Chem. C 111, 9019-9038 (2007).
- Self-assembly of inorganic nanocrystals: Fabrication and collective intrinsic properties; M.P. Pileni; Acc. of Chem. Res. 40, 685-693 (2007).
- Supracrystals of inorganic nanocrystals: An open challenge for new physical properties; M.P. Pileni; Acc. Chem. Res. 41, 1799-1809 (2008).
- How to produce 2D self-organizations of inorganic nanocrystals and how do they affect the chemical and physical properties; M.P. Pileni; Phys. Chem. Chem. Phys. 12, 11821–11835, (2010).
- Analogy Between Atoms in a Nanocrystal and Nanocrystals in a Supracrystal: Is It Real or Just a Highly Probable Speculation?; N. Goubet, M. P. Pileni; J. Phys. Chem. Lett. 2, 1024–1031, (2011).
- Supra and Nano crystallinity : Specific properties related to crystal growth mechanisms and nanocrystallinity; M.P.Pileni, Acc. Chem. Res. 45, 1965-1972 (2012).
- Crystallinity Segregation upon Selective Self- Assembling of Gold Colloidal Single Nanocrystals; H.Portales, N. Goubet, S.Sirotki, E. Duval, A. Mermet, P. Albouy, and M.P. Pileni Nano Lett. 12, 5292−5298, (2012).
- Unexpected electronic properties of micrometer-thick supracrystals of Au nanocrystals; P. Yang, I. Arfaoui, T. Cren, N. Goubet and M.P. Pileni, Nano Lett. 12, 2051–2055, (2012).
- Simultaneous Growths of Gold Colloidal Crystals; N. Goubet, H. Portalès, C. Yan, I.Arfaoui1, P.A. Albouy, A. Mermet and M.P.Pileni J.Am..Chem.Soc., 134, 3714-3719 (2012).
- Coherent Longitudinal Acoustic Phonons in Three-Dimensional Supracrystals of Cobalt Nanocrystals; I. Lisiecki, D. Polli, C. Yan, G. Soavi, E. Duval, G. Cerullo and M.P. Pileni Nano Lett. 13,, 4914-4919 (2013).
- Modulating the Physical Properties of Isolated and Self-Assembled Nanocrystals by Change in Their Nanocrystallinity; N. Goubet, C.Yan, D. Polli, H.Portalès, I.Arfaoui, G. Cerullo and M. P. Pileni Nano Lett. 13, 504−508 (2013).
- Spontaneous formation of high-index planes in Au single domain nanocrystal superlattices; N. Goubet, J.Yang, P.A.Albouy and M.P.Pileni Nano Lett. 14, 6632-6638 (2014).
- Negative Supracrystals Inducing an FCC-BCC Transition in a Gold Nanocrystal Superlattice; N. Goubet and M-P. Pileni Nano Res. 7, 171-179 (2014).
- Control of the oxygen and cobalt atoms diffusion through Co nanoparticles differing by their crystalline structure and size Z. Yang, N. Yang, J. Yang, J. Bergström and M.P. Pileni "Adv.Funct.Mater". 25, 891-897 (2015).
- Beyond Entropy: Magnetic Forces Induce Formation of Quasicrystalline Structure in Binary Nanocrystal Superlattice; Z. Yang, J. Wei, P. Bonville, M.P. Pileni" J.Am. Chem Soc" 137, 4487−4493 (2015).
- Nano-supracrystallinity; M.P.Pileni "EPL" 109 58001 (2015).
- Engineering the magnetic dipolar interactions in three-dimensional binary supracrystals via mesoscale alloying; Z. Yang, J. Wei, P. Bonville, M.P. Pileni" Adv. Funct.Mater" 25 4908- (2015).
- Ligand Exchange Governs the Crystal Structures in Binary Nanocrystal Superlattices; J. Wei, N. Schaeffer and M. P Pileni" J. Am. Chem. Soc" 137 14773-14784 (2015).
- Hierarchical mechanical behavior of cobalt supracrystals related to nanocrystallinity; M.Gauvin, N. Yang, Z. Yang, I.Arfaoui and M.P.Pileni" Nanoresearch" 8 3480-3487 (2015).
- Supracrystalline Colloidal Eggs: Epitaxial Growth and Freestanding Three-Dimensional Supracrystals in Nanoscaled Colloidosome; Z.Yang, T. Altantzis, D. Zanaga, S. Bals, G. Van Tendeloo, M.P Pileni" J.Amer. Chem.Soc" 138 3493–3500 (2016).
- Dispersion of Hydrophobic Co Supracrystal in Aqueous Solution; N. Yang, Z. Yang, M. Held, P. Bonville, P.A. Albouy, R. Lévy, M.PPileni" ACS Nano" 10 2277–2286 (2016).
- 3D superlattices of uniform metal nanocrystals differing by their sizes called binary supracrystals; J. Wei, Z. Yang, and M. P Pileni" EPL" 119 38005, (2017).
- Water-Dispersed Hydrophobic Au Nanocrystal Assemblies with a Plasmon Fingerprint; N. Yang, C.Deeb, J.L Pelouard, N. Felidj and M.P. Pileni" ACS Nano" 11 7797−7806, (2017).
- Impact of the metallic crystalline structure on the properties of nanocrystals and their mesoscopic assemblies; M.P.Pileni" Acc. Chem. Res" 50 1946–1955 (2017).
- Light–heat conversion dynamics in highly diversified water-dispersed hydrophobic nanocrystal assemblies, A.Mazzanti, Z. Yang, M. G. Silva, N. Yang, G. Rizza, P.E. Coulon, C. Manzonif, A. M. de Paula, G. Cerullo, G. Della Valle and M.P. Pileni Proc. Natl. Acad. Sci. USA, 116, 8161-8166 (2019)
- Self-Assemblies of Nanocrystals in Tumor Cells: Controlling the Intracellular Fate, Manipulation, and Photothermal Effects, J. Phys. Chem. C 2021, 125, 37, 20143–20156
- Self-assemblies of Fe_{3}O_{4} nanocrystals: towards nanoscale precision of photothermal effects in the tumor microenvironment. A. Nicolas-Boluda, Z.Yang, T.Guilbert, L. Fouassier, F. Carn, F. Gazeau, M. P. Pileni Adv. Funct. Mater., 2021, 31, 2006824 (1-17)
- Intracellular Fate of Hydrophobic Nanocrystal Self-Assemblies in Tumor Cells. A. Nicolas-Boluda, Z. Yang, I. Dobryden, F. Carn, N. Winckelmans, Ch. Péchoux, P. Bonville, S. Bals, P. M. Claesson, F. Gazeau, and M. P Pileni Adv. Funct. Mater., 2020, 30, 2004274 (1-15)
