= Nanoreactor =

Form of chemical reactor

Nanoreactors are a form of chemical reactor that are particularly in the disciplines of nanotechnology and nanobiotechnology. These special reactors are crucial in maintaining a working nanofoundry. Which is essentially a foundry that manufactures products on a nanotechnological scale.

== Summary ==
=== General information ===
The term nanoreactor refers to an isolated system on the nanometer scale that is used to run chemical reactions in an environment that differs drastically from a reaction in bulk solution. The synthesis and analysis of these nanoreactors is a highly interdisciplinary subject, spanning from chemistry and physics to biology and materials science. These systems can be synthetic, such as nanopores and hollow nanoparticles, or they can be biological systems, including protein pores and channels. Generally, the effect of confinement provided by these nanoreactors results in novel chemistry. This field has only begun to receive significant attention in the last two decades, and more work is constantly being published as nanoreactors become more sophisticated and begin to show promise for industrial applications.

Researchers in the Netherlands have succeeded in building nanoreactors that can perform one-pot multistep reactions - the next step towards artificial cell-like devices in addition for applications involving the screening and diagnosis of a disease or illness. A biochemical nanoreactor is created simply by unwrapping a biological virus through scientific methods, eliminating its harmful contents, and re-assembling its protein coat around a single molecule of enzyme. The kinetic isotope effect is trapped in a single molecule within a membrane-based nanoreactor. This is a phenomenon that has been found by researchers in the United Kingdom during experiments done in September 2010. The kinetic isotope effect, where the rate of a reaction is influenced by the presence of an isotopic atom in solution, is an important principle for elucidating reaction mechanisms. This recent finding could open up new methods to study chemical reactions. They may even aid in the process of creating new (and even more powerful) nanoreactors.

Using nanocrystals, a scalable and inexpensive process can ultimately create nanoreactors. Researchers at the Lawrence Berkeley National Laboratory in Berkeley have the ability to take advantage of the large difference in select components to create these nanocrystals and nanoreactors. Nanocrystals are easier to use and less expensive than methods that employ sacrificial templates in the creation process of hollow particles. Catalyst particles are separated into shells in order to prevent particle aggregation. Selective entry into the catalysis chamber reduces the likelihood of desired products undergoing secondary reactions.

Nanoreactors can also be built by controlling the positioning of two different enzymes in the central water reservoir or the plastic membrane of synthetic nanoscopic bubbles. Once the third enzyme is added into the surrounding solution, it becomes possible for three different enzymatic reactions to occur at once without interfering with each other (resulting in a "one-pot" reaction). The potential for nanoreactors can be demonstrated by binding the enzyme horseradish peroxidase into the membrane itself; trapping the enzyme glucose oxidase. The surrounding solution would end up containing the enzyme lipase B with the glucose molecules containing four acetyl groups as the substrate. The resulting glucose would cross the membrane, become oxidized, and the horseradish peroxidase would convert the sample substrate ABTS (2,2’-azinobis(3-ethylbenzthiazoline-6-sulfonic acid)) into its radical cation.

=== Abilities ===
Nanoreactors can also be used to emulsify water, create hydrofuels (which essentially blends 15% water into the refined diesel product), play a helpful role in the chemical industry by allowing multiple streams of raw materials to exists in a single nanoreactor, manufacture personal care products (i.e., lotions, pharmaceutical creams, shampoos, conditioners, shower gels, deodorants), and improve the food and beverage industries (by processing sauces, purées, cooking bases for soup, emulsifying non-alcoholic beverages, and salad dressings).

Personal care goods can be enhanced by companies feeding multiple phases of material, using a mixing device with water, and creating instant emulsions. These emulsions would come with smaller particles, are expected to have a longer shelf life and an give off an enhanced appearance when sold at retailers. The needs of the food and beverage industry can result in lower processing costs, more space, better efficiency, and lower equipment costs. This may bring down the cost of food and beverages for consumers; even alcoholic beverages that are subject to hidden sin taxes.

Hydrofuel can be used to move heavy duty transports, trains, earth-moving equipment (including bulldozers), in addition to providing fuel to most boats and ships. Reduced pollution and increased fuel efficiency may come out of nanoreactor-produced hydrofuel. The increased usage of renewable energy may also help to improve the world's environment thanks to nanoreactors.

=== Applications ===
Roy, Skinner, et al. studied the dynamics of water in self-assembled gemini surfactants in 2014. This work illustrates not only the utility of nano-scale materials for chemical reactions, but also the complexity that is required to study the effects. The team utilized spectroscopic techniques and molecular dynamics simulations to determine that within the nanoporous structures, the dynamics of water in the gyroid phase is an order of magnitude slower than in the bulk water. This result arises from the difference in curvature at the interfaces of the normal gyroid. When compared with water confined in a reverse spherical micelle of a sulfonate surfactant, the water exhibited faster dynamics. This complex behavior was postulated to have implications for future work in ion transport.

Carbon nanotubes have been a popular area of research, and specifically, single-walled carbon nanotubes provide unique surfaces for chemistry. Li, G and Fu, C et al. report on large changes to the Raman spectra by encapsulating sulfur in these single-walled carbon nanotubes. In an example of how confinement to such small spaces influences chemistry, the authors theorize that the changes to the Raman spectra can be attributed to van der Waals interactions of the sulfur with the walls of the nanotubes. These effects are highly sensitive to the size of the confinement chamber, as the van der Waals interactions were not significant for larger diameter single-walled nanotubes. The authors suggest that confinement within the single-walled nanotubes allows S_{2} molecules to undergo polymerization to linear diradicals.

Nanoreactors are also being applied to biological spaces. In a study by Tagliazucchi and Szleifer, they study the binding of proteins to ligands inside both long nanochannels and short nanopores. Inside these confined spaces, the ligands are attached to the walls by polymeric tethers. This technology has already seen applications as sensors that measure concentrations of proteins in solution. This study developed a theory to model how the proteins bind under these highly confined conditions to inform the design of these sensors.
