= Monokote =

Lightweight plastic shrink wrap film

MonoKote was a commercially available lightweight plastic shrink wrap film available in various colors. It had a heat-activated adhesive on one side and was used to cover the surfaces of a model aircraft. The material is cut to size and applied to the airframe surfaces using a hobby iron and heat gun. Top Flite MonoKote covering film is produced by General Formulations of Sparta, Michigan.

The name MonoKote, a registered trademark of model aircraft manufacturer Top Flite, refers to the fact that it is a one-step covering material to coat the surface of the model. MonoKote was discontinued by Top Flite's subsequent owners, Horizon Hobbies. The patent for Top Flite MonoKote is held by Sidney Axelrod.

Unrelated to the model aircraft material, MonoKote is also a type of fireproofing material, which is either gypsum- or cement-based and is spray-applied. The name MONOKOTE is the subject of global trademark registrations owned by GCP Applied Technologies Inc., a Delaware Corporation formed from the Grace Construction Products and Packaging businesses that were spun off from W. R. Grace & Co. in February 2016 (e.g., US Registration No. 1,468,327; Canadian Registration No. 858389; and other international registrations).

On January 10, 2018, it was announced that parent company Hobbico had filed for Chapter 11 bankruptcy protection. In June 2018, it was announced that Hobbico had filed for Chapter 7 bankruptcy and went into liquidation.
