= 7 World Trade Center (1987–2001) =

Former office building in Manhattan, New York

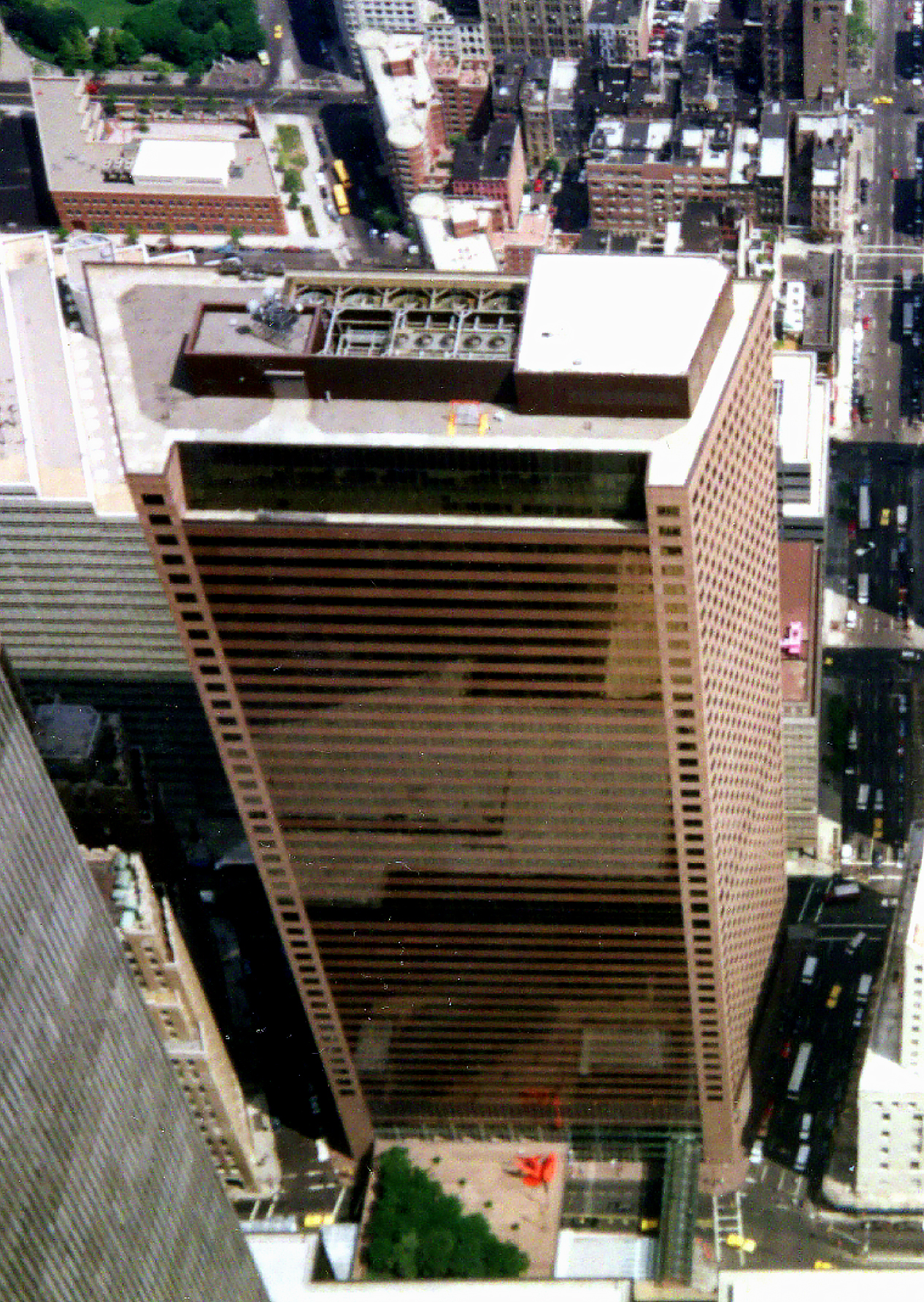
- The original 7 World Trade Center from the WTC observation deck in August 1992; Bent Propeller can be seen at the bottom.
- Alternative names: WTC 7; 7 WTC; Building 7; Tower 7; Salomon Brothers Building

General information
- Status: Destroyed
- Type: Office
- Location: 250 Greenwich Street; Manhattan, New York City 10006, United States
- Coordinates: 40.7133°N 74.0119°W
- Construction started: October 2, 1984
- Completed: March 1987
- Opened: May 1987
- Destroyed: September 11, 2001

Height
- Architectural: 610 ft (190 m)

Technical details
- Floor count: 47
- Floor area: 2,000,000 sq ft (190,000 m^{2})
- Lifts/elevators: 32

Design and construction
- Architect: Emery Roth & Sons
- Developer: Silverstein Properties
- Structural engineer: Irwin Cantor
- Main contractor: Tishman Construction

7 World Trade Center (7 WTC, WTC-7, or Tower 7), colloquially known as Building 7 or the Salomon Brothers Building, was an office building constructed as part of the original World Trade Center complex in Lower Manhattan, New York City. The tower was located on a city block bounded by West Broadway, Vesey Street, Washington Street, and Barclay Street on the east, south, west, and north, respectively. It was developed by Larry Silverstein, who held a ground lease for the site from the Port Authority of New York and New Jersey, and designed by Emery Roth & Sons. It was destroyed during the September 11 attacks.

The original 7 World Trade Center was 47 stories tall, clad in red granite masonry, and occupied a trapezoidal footprint. An elevated walkway spanning Vesey Street connected the building to the World Trade Center plaza. The building was situated above a Consolidated Edison power substation, which imposed unique structural design constraints. The building opened in 1987, and Salomon Brothers signed a long-term lease the next year, becoming the anchor tenant of 7 WTC.

On September 11, 2001, the structure was substantially damaged by debris when the nearby North Tower (1 World Trade Center) collapsed. The debris cut a large gash in the south side of the building and ignited fires on multiple lower floors, which continued to burn uncontrolled throughout the afternoon. The building's internal fire suppression system lacked water pressure to fight the fires. 7 WTC began to collapse when a critical internal column buckled and triggered cascading failure of nearby columns throughout. This initiated the progressive collapse of the entire building just after 5:20 pm, according to FEMA and NIST. The collapse made 7 WTC the first steel skyscraper known to have collapsed primarily due to uncontrolled fires. A new building on the site opened in 2006.

== Architecture ==
Transfer trusses used on the 5–7th floors to redistribute load to the foundation

The original 7 World Trade Center was a 47-story building, designed by Emery Roth & Sons, with a red granite facade. The building was 610 feet (190 m) tall, with a trapezoidal footprint that was 330 ft (100 m) long and 140 ft (43 m) wide. Tishman Realty & Construction managed construction of the building.

=== Features ===
==== Mechanical features ====
7 World Trade Center was constructed above a two-story Con Edison substation that had been located on the site since 1967. The substation had a caisson foundation designed to carry the weight of a future building of 25 stories containing 600,000 sq ft (56,000 m^{2}). However, the final design for 7 World Trade Center was for a much larger building than originally planned when the substation was built. The structural design of 7 World Trade Center therefore included a system of gravity column transfer trusses and girders, located between floors 5 and 7, to transfer loads to the smaller foundation. Existing caissons installed in 1967 were used, along with new ones, to accommodate the building. The 5th floor functioned as a structural diaphragm, providing lateral stability and the distribution of loads between the new and old caissons. Above the 7th floor, the building's structure was a typical tube-frame design, with columns in the core and on the perimeter, and lateral loads resisted by perimeter moment frames.

A shipping and receiving ramp, which served the entire World Trade Center complex, occupied the eastern quarter of the 7 World Trade Center footprint. The building was open below the 3rd floor, providing space for truck clearance on the shipping ramp. The spray-on fireproofing for structural steel elements was gypsum-based Monokote, which had a two-hour fire rating for steel beams, girders, and trusses, and a three-hour rating for columns.

Mechanical equipment was installed on floors four through seven, including 12 transformers on the 5th floor. Several emergency generators installed in the building were used by the New York City Office of Emergency Management, Salomon Smith Barney, and other tenants. In order to supply the generators, 24,000 gallons (91,000 L) of diesel fuel were stored below ground level. Diesel fuel distribution components were located at ground level, up to the ninth floor. The roof of the building included a small west penthouse and a larger east mechanical penthouse.

==== Offices ====
Each floor had 47,000 sq ft (4,400 m^{2}) of rentable office space, which made the building's floor plans considerably larger than most office buildings in the city. In all, 7 World Trade Center had 1,868,000 sq ft (173,500 m^{2}) of office space. Two pedestrian bridges connected the main World Trade Center complex, across Vesey Street, to the third floor of 7 World Trade Center. In addition to several acquired artworks, from artists such as Frank Stella, Roy Lichtenstein, and Ross Bleckner, the lobby of 7 World Trade Center housed a large mural by artist Al Held, titled The Third Circle.

== History ==
The groundbreaking ceremony was hosted on October 2, 1984. The building opened in May 1987 as part of the World Trade Center.

In June 1986, before construction was completed, developer Larry Silverstein signed Drexel Burnham Lambert as a tenant to lease the entire 7 World Trade Center building for $3 billion over a term of 30 years. In December 1986, after the Boesky insider-trading scandal, Drexel Burnham Lambert canceled the lease, leaving Silverstein to find other tenants. Spicer & Oppenheim agreed to lease 14 percent of the space, but for more than a year, as Black Monday and other factors adversely affected the Lower Manhattan real estate market, Silverstein was unable to find tenants for the remaining space. By April 1988, he had lowered the rent and made other concessions.

In November 1988, Salomon Brothers withdrew from plans to build a large new complex at Columbus Circle in Midtown, instead agreeing to a 20-year lease for the top 19 floors of 7 World Trade Center. The building was extensively renovated in 1989 to accommodate Salomon Brothers, and 7 World Trade Center alternatively became known as the Salomon Brothers building. Most of the three existing floors were removed as tenants continued to occupy other stories, and more than 350 tons (U.S.) of steel were added to construct three double-height trading floors. Nine diesel generators were installed on the 5th floor as part of a backup power station. "Essentially, Salomon is constructing a building within a building – and it's an occupied building, which complicates the situation", said a district manager of Silverstein Properties. According to Larry Silverstein, the unusual task was possible because it could allow "entire portions of floors to be removed without affecting the building's structural integrity, on the assumption that someone might need double-height floors."

After the World Trade Center bombing of February 26, 1993, New York City mayor Rudy Giuliani decided to situate the emergency command center and associated fuel tanks at 7 World Trade Center. Although this decision was criticized in light of the events of 9/11, the fuel in the building is not believed to have contributed to the collapse of the building.

=== Final tenants ===
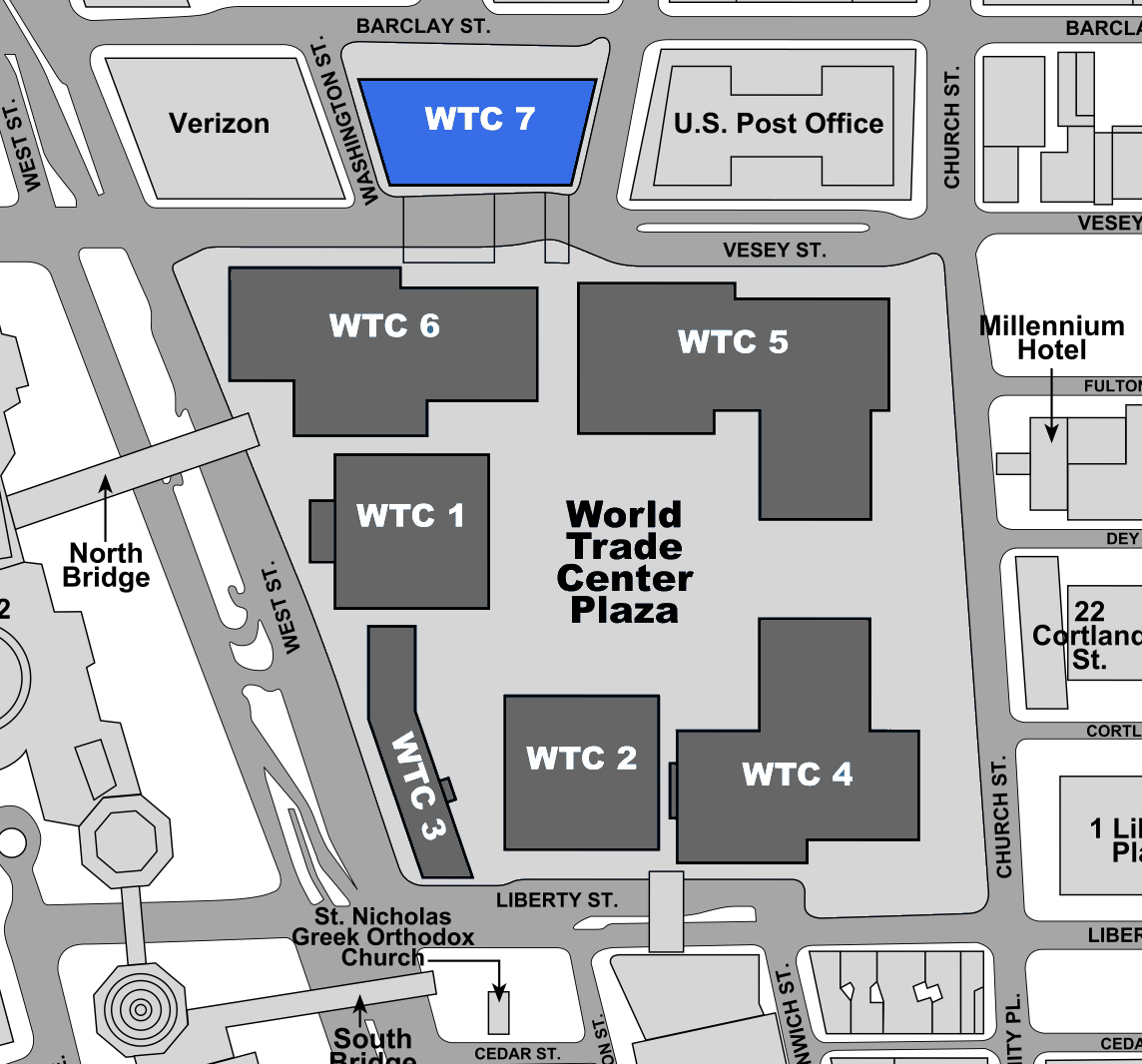
The position of 7 WTC in relation to the other WTC buildings before September 11, 2001

At the time of the September 11 attacks, Salomon Smith Barney was by far the largest tenant in 7 World Trade Center, occupying 1,202,900 sq ft (111,750 m^{2}) (64 percent of the building) which included floors 28–45. Other major tenants included ITT Hartford Insurance Group (122,590 sq ft/11,400 m^{2}), American Express Bank International (106,117 sq ft/9,900 m^{2}), Standard Chartered Bank (111,398 sq ft/10,350 m^{2}), and the Securities and Exchange Commission (106,117 sq ft/9,850 m^{2}). Smaller tenants included the Internal Revenue Service Regional Council (90,430 sq ft/8,400 m^{2}) and the United States Secret Service (85,343 sq ft/7,900 m^{2}). The smallest tenants included the New York City Office of Emergency Management, National Association of Insurance Commissioners, Federal Home Loan Bank of New York, First State Management Group Inc., Provident Financial Management, and the Immigration and Naturalization Service. The Department of Defense (DOD) and Central Intelligence Agency (CIA) shared the 25th floor with the IRS. (The clandestine CIA office was revealed only after the 9/11 attacks.) Floors 46–47 were mechanical floors, as were the bottom six floors and part of the seventh floor.

According to CoStar Group, floors 9 and 10 of 7 WTC were occupied by the Secret Service. The CIA had offices on the 25th floor of 7 WTC, as reported by the Associated Press. The National Institute of Standards and Technology's 2008 Final Report on the Collapse of World Trade Center Building 7 confirmed that floor 14 was vacant, and updated the news reports of CoStar and Associated Press from 2001 to show that Salomon Smith Barney leased floors 15 to 17.

Fl#	Companies
28–45	Salomon Smith Barney
26–27	Salomon Smith Barney, Standard Chartered Bank
25	Department of Defense, Central Intelligence Agency, Internal Revenue Service Regional Council
24	Salomon Smith Barney, Internal Revenue Service Regional Council
23	Salomon Smith Barney, NYC Office of Emergency Management
22	Salomon Smith Barney, Federal Home Loan Bank
21	Salomon Smith Barney, First State Management Group, Hartford Financial Services Group
20	Salomon Smith Barney, Hartford Financial Services Group
19	Salomon Smith Barney, Hartford Financial Services Group, National Association of Insurance Commissioners Securities
18	Salomon Smith Barney, U.S. Equal Employment Opportunity Commission
15–17	Salomon Smith Barney
14	Vacant
13	Salomon Smith Barney, Provident Bank, American Express, U.S. Securities and Exchange Commission, Standard Chartered Bank
11–12	U.S. Securities and Exchange Commission
10	U.S. Secret Service, Standard Chartered Bank
9	U.S. Secret Service
8	American Express
7	American Express, Provident Bank
G, 1–6	Salomon Smith Barney

The total amount of space occupied by each tenant was:

Tenant	Square feet leased	Floors occupied	Industry
Salomon Smith Barney	1,202,900	0–6, 13, 15–24, 26-47	Financial Institutions
Internal Revenue Service Regional Council	90,430	24, 25	Government
U.S. Secret Service	85,343	9,10	Government
American Express Bank International	106,117	7, 8, 13	Financial Institutions
Standard Chartered Bank	111,398	10, 13, 26, 27	Financial Institutions
Provident Financial Management	9,000	7, 13	Financial Institutions
ITT Hartford Insurance Group	122,590	19–21	Financial Institutions
First State Management Group	4,000	21	Insurance
Federal Home Loan Bank	47,490	22	Financial Institutions
National Association of Insurance Commissioners Securities	22,500	19	Insurance
Securities & Exchange Commission	106,117	11, 12, 13	Government
New York City Office of Emergency Management	45,815	23	Government

=== Collapse ===
Collapse of 7 World Trade Center
- Part of September 11 attacks and Collapse of the World Trade Center
- Location: 7 World Trade Center
- Date: September 11, 2001; 5:21 pm (Eastern Daylight Time)
- Target: Civilians
- Attack type: Building collapse
- Deaths: 0
- Injuries: Unknown

As the North Tower (1 World Trade Center) collapsed on September 11, 2001, heavy debris hit 7 World Trade Center, damaging the south face of the building and starting fires that continued to burn throughout the afternoon. The collapse also caused damage to the southwest corner between floors 7 and 17 and on the south face between floor 44 and the roof; other possible structural damage included a large vertical gash near the center of the south face between floors 24 and 41. The building was equipped with a sprinkler system, but had many single-point vulnerabilities for failure: the sprinkler system required manual initiation of the electrical fire pumps instead of being a fully automatic system; the floor-level controls had a single connection to the sprinkler water riser, and the sprinkler system required some power for the fire pump to deliver water. Additionally, water pressure was low, with little or no water to feed sprinklers.

After the North Tower collapsed, some firefighters entered 7 World Trade Center to search the building. They attempted to extinguish small pockets of fire, but low water pressure hindered their efforts. Over the course of the day, fires burned out of control on several floors of 7 World Trade Center, the flames visible on the east side of the building. During the afternoon, the fire was also seen on floors 6–10, 13–14, 19–22, and 29–30. In particular, the fires on floors 7 through 9 and 11 through 13 continued to burn out of control during the afternoon. At approximately 2:00 pm, firefighters noticed a bulge in the southwest corner of 7 World Trade Center between the 10th and 13th floors, a sign that the building was unstable and might collapse. During the afternoon, firefighters also heard creaking sounds coming from the building. Around 4:00 pm, FDNY Chief of Operations Daniel A. Nigro decided to halt rescue operations and evacuate the immediate area due to concerns for the safety of personnel.

The fire expanded the girders of the building, causing some to collapse. This led to the northeast corner core column (Column 79), which was especially large, to buckle below the 13th floor. This caused the floors above it to collapse to the transfer floor at the fifth level. The structure also developed cracks in the facade just before the entire building started to fall. The facade experienced a roughly 2.25-second period of near-free-fall during the recorded 5.4-second part of its collapse. According to the Federal Emergency Management Agency (FEMA), this collapse started at 5:20:33 pm EDT when the east mechanical penthouse started crumbling. Differing times are given as to what time the building completely collapsed: at 5:21:10 pm EDT according to FEMA, and at 5:20:52 pm EDT according to NIST.

There were no casualties associated with the collapse. NIST found no evidence to support conspiracy theories such as the collapse being the result of explosives; it found that a combination of factors including physical damage, fire, and the building's unusual construction set off a chain-reaction collapse.

==== Reports ====
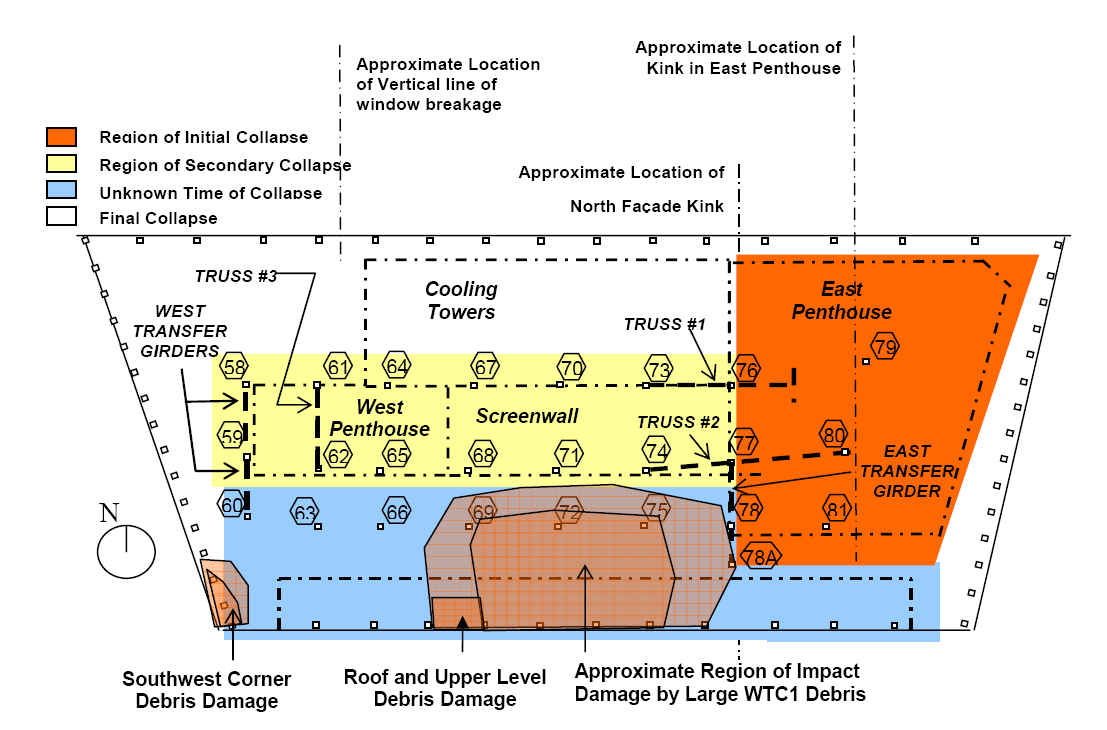
Schematic view of collapse progression, with structural failure initiating on lower floors, on the east side of the building and vertical progression up to the east mechanical penthouse

In May 2002, FEMA issued a report on the collapse based on a preliminary investigation conducted jointly with the Structural Engineering Institute of the American Society of Civil Engineers under the leadership of Dr. W. Gene Corley, P.E. FEMA made preliminary findings that the collapse was not primarily caused by actual impact damage from the collapse of 1 WTC and 2 WTC but by fires on multiple stories ignited by debris from the other two towers that continued burning unabated due to lack of water for sprinklers or manual firefighting. The report did not reach conclusions about the cause of the collapse and called for further investigation.

Subsequently, NIST was authorized to lead an investigation into the structural failure and collapse of the World Trade Center Twin Towers and 7 World Trade Center. The investigation, led by Dr S. Shyam Sunder, drew upon in-house technical expertise as well as the knowledge of several outside private institutions, including the Structural Engineering Institute of the American Society of Civil Engineers (SEI/ASCE); the Society of Fire Protection Engineers (SFPE); the National Fire Protection Association (NFPA); the American Institute of Steel Construction (AISC); the Council on Tall Buildings and Urban Habitat (CTBUH); and the Structural Engineers Association of New York (SEAoNY).

Few photos and video clips exist that show the damage sustained to the south face of 7 World Trade Center on 9/11. An ABC News helicopter captured footage of the south face of 7 World Trade Center, including a glimpse of a gash, extending approximately 10 stories.

The bulk of the investigation of 7 World Trade Center was delayed until after reports were completed on the Twin Towers. In the meantime, NIST provided a preliminary report about 7 WTC in June 2004, and thereafter released occasional updates on the investigation. According to NIST, the investigation of 7 World Trade Center was delayed for a number of reasons, including that NIST staff who had been working on 7 World Trade Center were assigned full-time from June 2004 to September 2005 to work on the investigation of the collapse of the Twin Towers. In June 2007, Shyam Sunder explained,

We are proceeding as quickly as possible while rigorously testing and evaluating a wide range of scenarios to reach the most definitive conclusion possible. The 7 WTC investigation is in some respects just as challenging, if not more so than the study of the towers. However, the current study does benefit greatly from the significant technological advances achieved and lessons learned from our work on the towers.

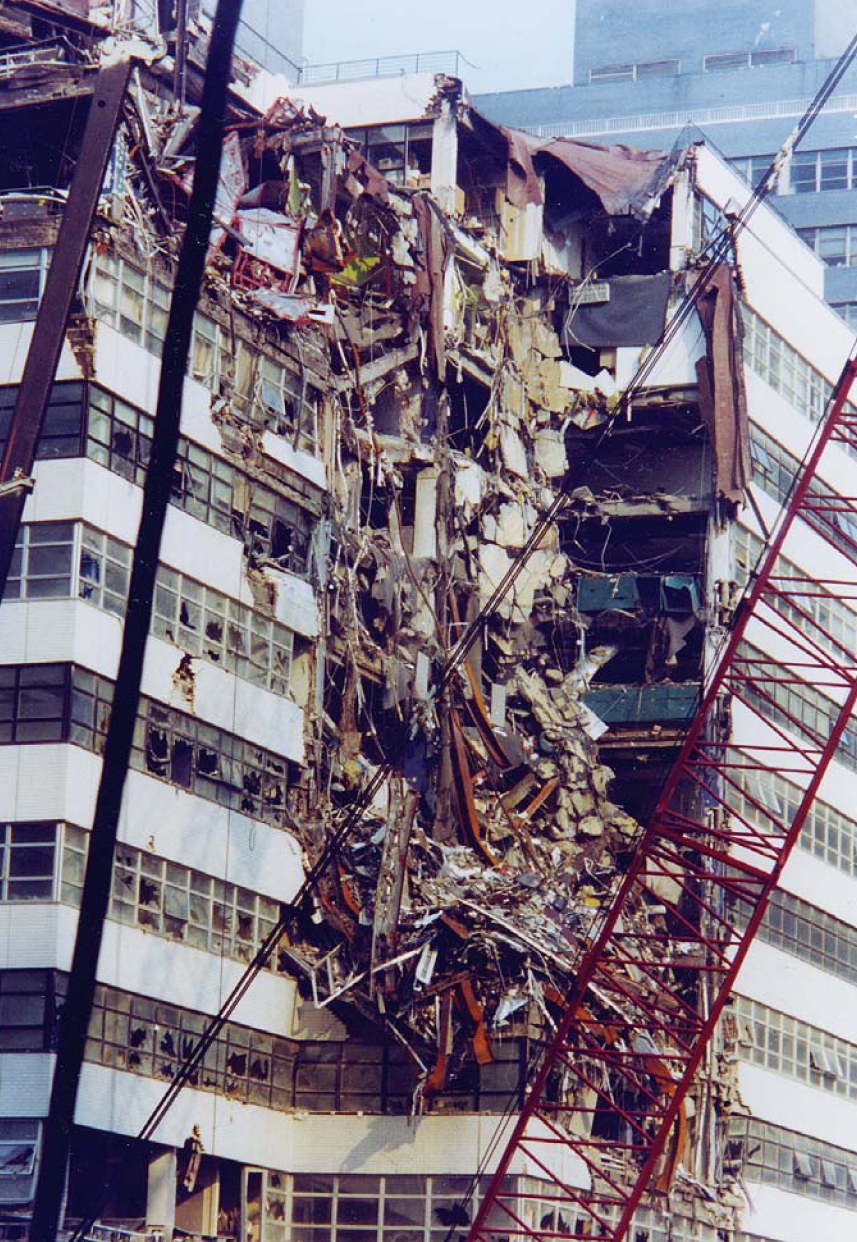
BMCC's Fiterman Hall was heavily damaged from the collapse of 7 World Trade Center.

In November 2008, NIST released its final report on the causes of the collapse of 7 World Trade Center. This followed NIST's August 21, 2008, draft report, which included a period for public comments, and was followed in 2012 by a peer-reviewed summary in the Journal of Structural Engineering. In its investigation, NIST utilized ANSYS to model events leading up to collapse initiation and LS-DYNA models to simulate the global response to the initiating events. NIST determined that diesel fuel did not play an important role, nor did the structural damage from the collapse of the Twin Towers or the transfer elements (trusses, girders, and cantilever overhangs). The lack of water to fight the fire was an important factor. The fires burned out of control during the afternoon, causing floor beams near column 79 to expand and push a key girder off its seat, triggering the floors to fail around column 79 on floors 8 to 14. With a loss of lateral support across nine floors, column 79 buckled – pulling the east penthouse and nearby columns down with it. With the buckling of these critical columns, the collapse then progressed east-to-west across the core, ultimately overloading the perimeter support, which buckled between Floors 7 and 17, causing the remaining portion of the building above to fall down as a single unit. The fires, which were fueled by office contents and burned for 7 hours, along with the lack of water, were the key reason for the collapse. At the time, this made the old 7 WTC the only steel skyscraper to have collapsed from fire; subsequently there have been others, including the Edifício Wilton Paes de Almeida, the Plasco Building, and the Windsor Tower.

Files relating to numerous federal investigations had been housed at 7 World Trade Center. The Equal Employment Opportunity Commission estimated over 10,000 of its cases were affected. Investigative files in the Secret Service's largest field office were lost, with one Secret Service agent saying, "All the evidence that we stored at 7 World Trade, in all our cases, went down with the building." Copies of emails in connection with the WorldCom scandal that were later requested by the SEC from Salomon Brothers, a subsidiary of Citigroup housed in the building, were also destroyed.

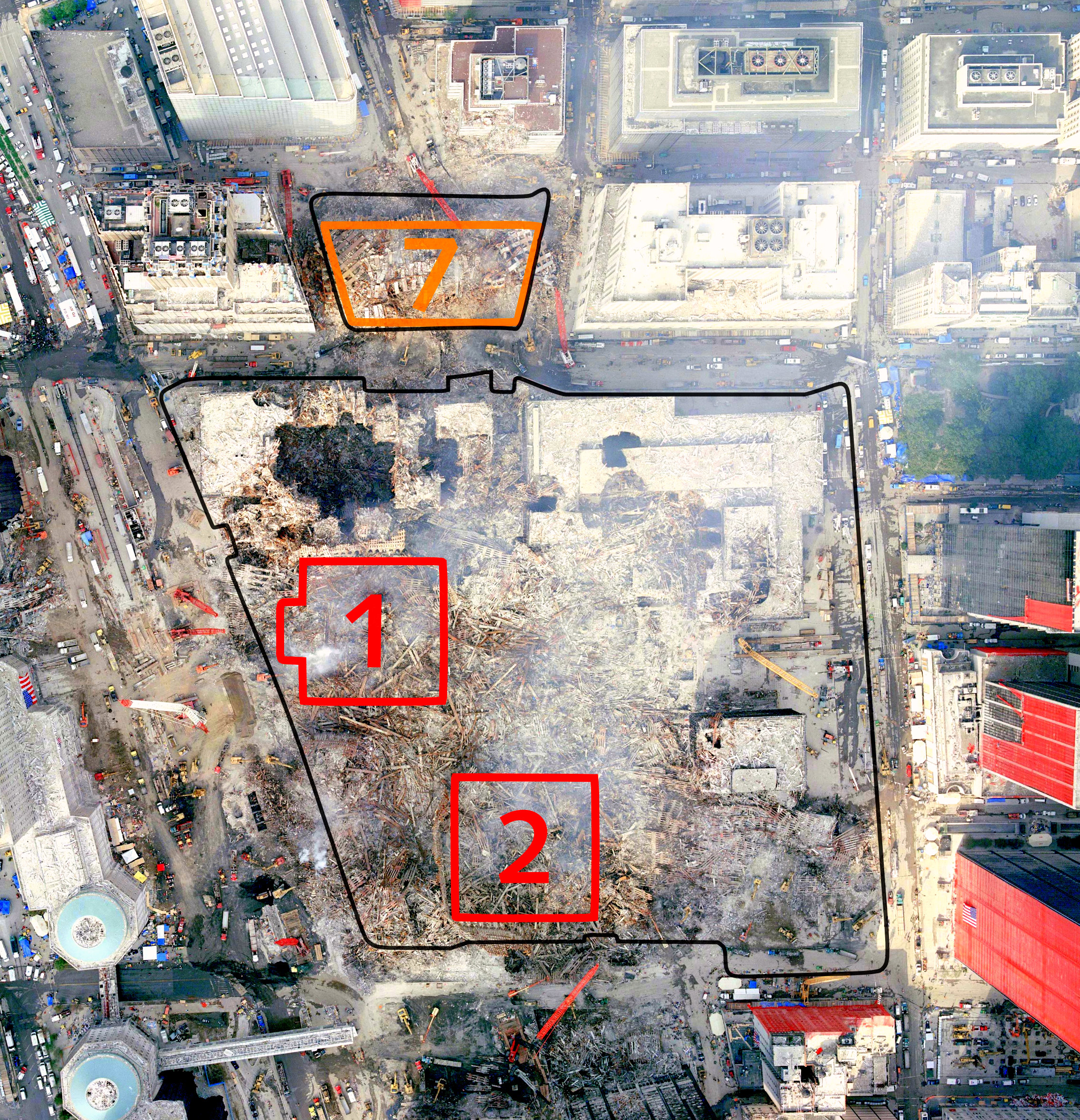
Aerial view of WTC remains and neighboring buildings on September 23, 2001, with the original footprints of the Twin Towers and 7 WTC outlined

The NIST report found no evidence supporting the conspiracy theories that 7 World Trade Center was brought down by controlled demolition. Specifically, the window breakage pattern and blast sounds that would have resulted from the use of explosives were not observed. The suggestion that an incendiary material such as thermite was used instead of explosives was considered unlikely by NIST because of the building's structural response to the fire, the nature of the fire, and the unlikelihood that a sufficient amount of thermite could be planted without discovery. Based on its investigation, NIST reiterated several recommendations it had made in its earlier report on the collapse of the Twin Towers. It urged immediate action on a further recommendation: that fire resistance should be evaluated under the assumption that sprinklers are unavailable; and that the effects of thermal expansion on floor support systems be considered. Recognizing that current building codes are drawn to prevent loss of life rather than building collapse, the main point of NIST's recommendations was that buildings should not collapse from fire even if sprinklers are unavailable.

==== Aftermath ====
The collapse of 7 WTC sent debris flying into the nearby Borough of Manhattan Community College's Fiterman Hall building, located at 30 West Broadway, damaging and contaminating it beyond repair. A revised plan called for demolition in 2009 and completion of the new Fiterman Hall in 2012, at a cost of $325 million. The collapse also damaged the eastern facade of the Barclay–Vesey Building, an Art Deco building to the west; it was restored at a cost of US$1.4 billion. Construction on the new 7 World Trade Center began in 2002, and the new structure opened in 2006.

Although the building collapsed at 5:21pm, BBC journalist Jane Standley announced that it had collapsed at 4:54pm, which led to conspiracy theories. The BBC explained that the building was on fire and that it had misunderstood the warnings of firefighters of imminent collapse, reporting that it had already happened.

== See also ==
- List of tallest buildings in New York City
- World Trade Center in popular culture
