= 9/11 conspiracy theories =

Theories on 2001 terror attacks in U.S.

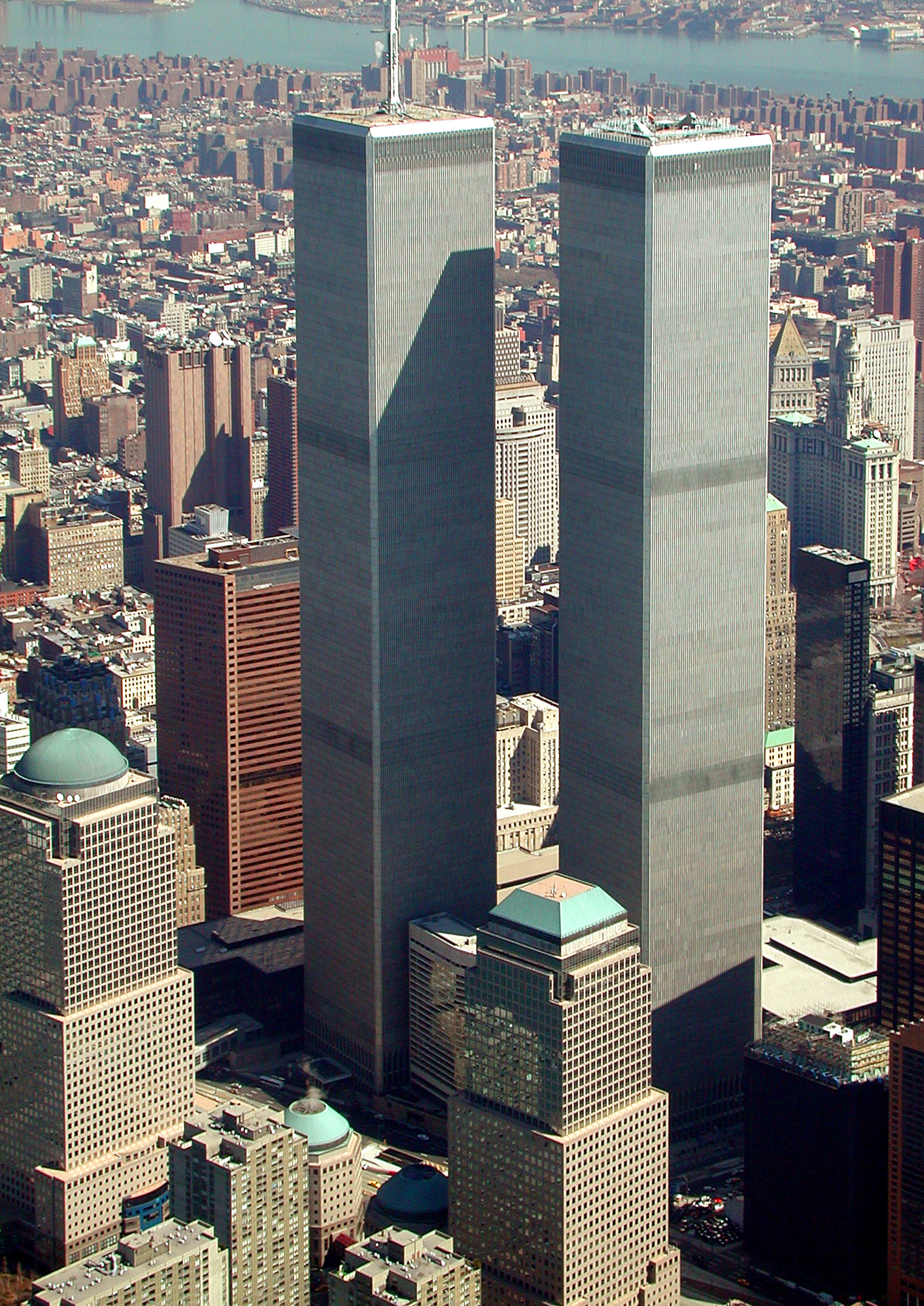
The nature of the collapse of the two World Trade Center towers and the nearby 7 World Trade Center (in this photo, the brown building to the left of the towers) is a major focus of 9/11 conspiracy theories.

Various conspiracy theories attribute the preparation and execution of the September 11 attacks against the United States to parties other than, or in addition to, al-Qaeda. These include the theory that high-level government officials had advance knowledge of the attacks. Government investigations and independent reviews have rejected these theories. Proponents of these theories assert that there are inconsistencies in the commonly accepted version, or that there is evidence that was ignored, concealed, or overlooked. Most of these theories either lack evidence or have been debunked by experts.

The most prominent conspiracy theory is that the collapse of the Twin Towers and 7 World Trade Center were the result of controlled demolitions rather than structural failure due to impact and fire. Another prominent belief is that the Pentagon was hit by a missile launched by elements from inside the U.S. government, or that hijacked planes were remotely controlled, or that commercial airliners were allowed to hit the targets via an effective stand-down of the U.S. military. Motives conspiracy theorists ascribe to such actions include justifying the U.S. invasions of Afghanistan in 2001 and Iraq in 2003 (even though the U.S. government concluded Iraq was not involved in the attacks) to advance U.S. geostrategic interests, such as plans to construct a natural gas pipeline through Afghanistan. Other conspiracy theories revolve around authorities having advance knowledge of the attacks and deliberately ignoring or assisting the attackers.

The National Institute of Standards and Technology (NIST) and the technology magazine Popular Mechanics investigated and rejected these theories. The 9/11 Commission and most of the civil engineering community accept that the impacts of jet aircraft at high speeds in combination with subsequent fires, not controlled demolition, led to the Twin Towers' collapse, but some conspiracy theory groups, including Architects & Engineers for 9/11 Truth, reject the scientific and expert consensus.

== Background ==
9/11 conspiracy theorists reject one or both of the following facts about the 9/11 attacks:

- Al-Qaeda suicide operatives hijacked and crashed United Airlines Flight 175 and American Airlines Flight 11 into the twin towers of the World Trade Center and crashed American Airlines Flight 77 into the Pentagon. The impact and resulting fires caused the Twin Towers' collapse and the destruction and damage of other buildings in the World Trade Center complex. The Pentagon was severely damaged by the airliner and the resulting fire. Hijackers also crashed a fourth plane into a field near Shanksville, Pennsylvania, after the passengers and flight crew attempted to regain control of the aircraft.
- Pre-attack warnings of varying detail of al-Qaeda's planned attacks against the U.S. were ignored due to lack of communication between various law enforcement and intelligence personnel. For the lack of interagency communication, the 9/11 report cited bureaucratic inertia and laws passed in the 1970s to prevent abuses that caused scandals during that era, most notably the Watergate scandal. The report faulted both the Clinton and the Bush administrations for "failure of imagination".

This consensus view is backed by various sources, including:

- Reports from government investigations: the 9/11 Commission Report (which incorporated intelligence information from the earlier FBI investigation (PENTTBOM) and the Joint Inquiry of 2002) and studies into building performance by the Federal Emergency Management Agency (FEMA) and the National Institute of Standards and Technology (NIST).
- Investigations by non-government organizations that support the accepted account, such as those by scientists at Purdue University.
- Articles supporting these facts and theories in magazines such as Popular Mechanics, Scientific American, and Time.
- Similar articles in news media worldwide, including The Times of India, the Canadian Broadcasting Corporation (CBC), the BBC, Le Monde, Deutsche Welle, the Australian Broadcasting Corporation (ABC), and The Chosun Ilbo of South Korea.

== History ==
Since the attacks, various conspiracy theories have been advanced in websites, books and films. Many groups and individuals advocating 9/11 conspiracy theories identify as part of the 9/11 Truth movement. Within six hours of the attack, a suggestion appeared in an online chatroom suggesting that the towers' collapse looked like a controlled demolition. "If, in a few days, not one official has mentioned anything about the controlled demolition part," the author wrote, "I think we have a REALLY serious problem." The first theories focused primarily on various perceived anomalies in the publicly available evidence; proponents later developed more specific theories about an alleged plot. One false allegation that circulated widely online is that no Jews were killed in the attack and that therefore the attacks must have been the work of the Mossad, not Islamist terrorists.

The first elaborated theories appeared in Europe. One week after the attacks, the "inside job" theory was the subject of a thesis by a researcher from the French National Centre for Scientific Research published in the newspaper Le Monde. Other theories sprang from around the world within weeks. Six months after the attacks, Thierry Meyssan's piece on 9/11, L'Effroyable Imposture (The Terrible Deceit), topped the French bestseller list. Its publication in English (as 9/11: The Big Lie) received little attention, but it remains one of the principal sources for "trutherism". 2003 saw the publication of former German state minister Andreas von Bülow's The CIA and September 11 and German journalist Gerhard Wisnewski's Operation 9/11; both were published by Mathias Bröckers, at the time an editor at the German newspaper Die Tageszeitung.

While these theories were popular in Europe, the U.S. media treated them with either bafflement or amusement, and the U.S. government dismissed them as the product of anti-Americanism. In an address to the United Nations on November 10, 2001, President George W. Bush denounced the "outrageous conspiracy theories [...] that attempt to shift the blame away from the terrorists, themselves, away from the guilty".

The 9/11 conspiracy theories started out mostly on the political left but broadened into what New York magazine described in 2011 as "terra incognita where left and right meet, fusing sixties countercultural distrust with the don't-tread-on-me variety".

By 2004, conspiracy theories about the attacks began to gain ground in the U.S. One explanation is that the rise in popularity stemmed more from growing criticism of the Iraq War and the newly reelected President Bush than from any discovery of new or more compelling evidence or improvement in the technical quality of the presentation of the theories. Knight Ridder news theorized that revelations that weapons of mass destruction did not exist in Iraq, the belated release of the President's Daily Brief of August 6, 2001, and reports that NORAD had lied to the 9/11 Commission might have fueled the theories.

Between 2004 and the fifth anniversary of the attacks in 2006, mainstream coverage of the conspiracy theories increased. The U.S. government issued a formal analysis by the National Institute of Standards and Technology (NIST) of the collapse of the World Trade Center. To address the growing publicity of the theories, the State Department revised a webpage in 2006 to debunk them. A 2006 national security strategy paper said that terrorism springs from "subcultures of conspiracy and misinformation" and that "terrorists recruit more effectively from populations whose information about the world is contaminated by falsehoods and corrupted by conspiracy theories. The distortions keep alive grievances and filter out facts that would challenge popular prejudices and self-serving propaganda." Al-Qaeda has repeatedly claimed responsibility for the attacks, with chief deputy Ayman al-Zawahiri accusing Shia Iran and Hezbollah of denigrating Sunni successes in hurting the U.S. by intentionally starting rumors that Israel carried out the attacks.

Some of the conspiracy theories about the attacks do not involve representational strategies typical of many conspiracy theories that establish a clear dichotomy between good and evil, or guilty and innocent; instead, they call up gradations of negligence and complicity. Bröckers, an early proponent of such theories, dismisses the commonly accepted account of the attacks as itself a conspiracy theory that seeks "to reduce complexity, disentangle what is confusing" and "explain the inexplicable".

Just before the fifth anniversary of the attacks, mainstream news outlets released a flurry of articles on the growth of 9/11 conspiracy theories. Time wrote: "This is not a fringe phenomenon. It is a mainstream political reality." Several surveys have included questions about beliefs related to the attacks. In 2008, 9/11 conspiracy theories topped a "greatest conspiracy theory" list compiled by The Daily Telegraph. The list was ranked by following and traction.

In 2010, the "International Center for 9/11 Studies", a private organization said to be sympathetic to conspiracy theories, sued for the release of videos collected by NIST of the attacks and aftermath. According to the German daily Frankfurter Allgemeine Zeitung, the videos that were published shortly before the ninth anniversary of the attacks provided "new food for conspiracy theorists". Many of the videos show images of 7 World Trade Center, a skyscraper in the vicinity of the Twin Towers that also collapsed on September 11, 2001.

9/11 truth figures Steven E. Jones and Mike Berger have said that the death of Osama bin Laden did not change their questions about the attacks or provide closure.

According to writer Jeremy Stahl, since Bush left office, the number of believers in 9/11 conspiracy theories has decreased, but the number of people who believe in the most "radical" theories has held fairly steady.

== Types ==
The most prominent conspiracy theories can be broadly divided into three main forms:

- LIHOP ("Let it happen on purpose") – suggests that key individuals within the government had at least some foreknowledge of the attacks and deliberately ignored it or actively weakened United States' defenses to ensure the hijacked flights were not intercepted. Similar allegations were made about Pearl Harbor and the October 7 attacks.
- MIHOP ("Make/Made it happen on purpose") – that key individuals within the government planned the attacks and collaborated with, or framed, al-Qaeda in carrying them out. There is a range of opinions about how this might have been achieved.
- Others – who reject the accepted account of the September 11 attacks but are not proposing specific theories, but try to demonstrate that the U.S. government's account of the events is wrong. This, according to them, would lead to a general call for a new official investigation into the events of September 11, 2001. According to Jonathan Kay, managing editor for comment at the Canadian newspaper National Post and author of Among the Truthers: A Journey Through America's Growing Conspiracist Underground, "They feel their job is to show everybody that the official theory of 9/11 is wrong. And then, when everybody is convinced, then the population will rise up and demand a new investigation with government resources, and that investigation will tell us what actually happened."

== Theories ==
=== Foreknowledge ===
Conspiracy theorists claim that action or inaction by U.S. officials with foreknowledge was intended to ensure that the attacks took place successfully. For example, Michael Meacher, former British environment minister and member of Tony Blair's government, said that the United States knowingly failed to prevent the attacks.

==== Suspected insider trading ====
Some conspiracy theorists maintain that just before 9/11, an "extraordinary" amount of put options were placed on United Airlines and American Airlines stocks and speculate that insiders may have known in advance of the coming events of 9/11 and placed their bets accordingly. An analysis into the possibility of insider trading on 9/11 concludes that:

A measure of abnormal long put volume was also examined and seen to be at abnormally high levels in the days leading up to the attacks. Consequently, the paper concludes that there is evidence of unusual option market activity in the days leading up to September 11 that is consistent with investors trading on advance knowledge of the attacks.

— Allen M. Poteshman, The Journal of Business

This study was intended to address the "great deal of speculation about whether option market activity indicated that the terrorists or their associates had traded in the days leading up to September 11 on advance knowledge of the impending attacks."

In the days leading up to 9/11, analysis shows a rise in the put to call ratio for United Airlines and American Airlines, the two airlines from which planes were hijacked on 9/11. Between September 6 and 7, the Chicago Board Options Exchange recorded purchases of 4,744 put option contracts in UAL and 396 call options. On September 10, more trading in Chicago saw the purchase of 4,516 put options in American Airlines, the other airline involved in the hijackings, with a mere 748 call options in American purchased that day. No other airline companies had an unusual put to call ratio in the days leading up to the attacks. The 9/11 Commission concluded that all these abnormal patterns in trading were coincidental.

Insurance companies saw anomalous trading activities as well. Citigroup Inc., which estimated that its Travelers Insurance unit could pay $500 million in claims from the World Trade Center attack, had about 45 times the normal volume during three trading days before the attack for options that profit if the stock falls below $40. Citigroup shares fell $1.25 in late trading to $38.09. Morgan Stanley, which occupied 22 floors at the World Trade Center, experienced bigger-than-normal pre-attack trading of options that profited when stock prices fell. Other companies directly affected by the tragedy had similar jumps.

The initial options were bought through at least two brokerage firms, including NFS, a subsidiary of Fidelity Investments, and TD Waterhouse. It was estimated that the trader or traders would have realized a five million dollar profit. The Securities and Exchange Commission launched an insider trading investigation in which Osama bin Laden was a suspect after receiving information from at least one Wall Street Firm.

The 9/11 Commission Report concluded that "Exhaustive investigations by the Securities and Exchange Commission, FBI, and other agencies have uncovered no evidence that anyone with advance knowledge of the attacks profited through securities transactions." The report further stated:

Highly publicized allegations of insider trading in advance of 9/11 generally rest on reports of unusual pre-9/11 trading activity in companies whose stock plummeted after the attacks. Some unusual trading did in fact occur, but each such trade proved to have an innocuous explanation. For example, the volume of put options – investments that pay off only when a stock drops in price – surged in the parent companies of United Airlines on September 6 and American Airlines on September 10 – highly suspicious trading on its face. Yet, further investigation has revealed that the trading had no connection with 9/11. A single U.S.-based institutional investor with no conceivable ties to al Qaeda purchased 95 percent of the UAL puts on September 6 as part of a trading strategy that also included buying 115,000 shares of American on September 10. Similarly, much of the seemingly suspicious trading in American on September 10 was traced to a specific U.S.-based options trading newsletter, faxed to its subscribers on Sunday, September 9, which recommended these trades. These examples typify the evidence examined by the investigation. The SEC and the FBI, aided by other agencies and the securities industry, devoted enormous resources to investigating this issue, including securing the cooperation of many foreign governments. These investigators have found that the apparently suspicious consistently proved innocuous.

==== Air-defense stand-down theory ====
A common claim among conspiracy theorists is that the North American Aerospace Defense Command (NORAD) issued a stand down order or deliberately scrambled fighters late to allow the hijacked airplanes to reach their targets without interference. According to this theory, NORAD had the capability of locating and intercepting planes on 9/11, and its failure to do so indicates a government conspiracy to allow the attacks to occur. Conspiracy theorist Mark R. Elsis said: "There is only one explanation for this ... Our Air Force was ordered to Stand Down on 9/11."

One of the first actions taken by the hijackers on 9/11 was to turn off or disable each of the four aircraft's on board transponders. Without these transponder signals to identify the airplane's tail number, altitude, and speed, the hijacked airplanes would have been only blips among 4,500 other blips on NORAD's radar screens, making them very difficult to track.

On 9/11, only 14 fighter jets were on alert in the contiguous 48 states. There was no automated method for the civilian air traffic controllers to alert NORAD. A passenger aircraft had not been hijacked in the U.S. since 1979. Maj. Douglas Martin, public affairs officer for NORAD, stated that "They had to pick up the phone and literally dial us". Only one civilian plane—a chartered Learjet 35 with golfer Payne Stewart and five others on board—was intercepted by NORAD over North America in the decade prior to 9/11, which took one hour and 19 minutes.

Rules in effect at that time, and on 9/11, barred supersonic flight on intercepts. Before 9/11, all other NORAD interceptions were limited to offshore Air Defense Identification Zones (ADIZ). FAA spokesman Bill Schumann said that "Until 9/11 there was no domestic ADIZ". After 9/11, the FAA and NORAD increased cooperation. They set up hotlines between command centers while NORAD increased its fighter coverage and installed radar to watch airspace over the continent.

The longest warning NORAD received of the hijackings was some eight minutes for American Airlines Flight 11, the first flight hijacked. The FAA alerted NORAD to the hijacked Flight 175 at just about the same time it was crashing into the World Trade Center's South Tower. The FAA notified NORAD of the missing – not hijacked – Flight 77 three minutes before it struck the Pentagon.

Regarding United Airlines Flight 93, Major General Larry Arnold indicated that there had been time to intercept the plane. However, NORAD was awaiting authorization to shoot it down, a decision that was ultimately made unnecessary by the actions of the passengers who stormed the cockpit, leading to the plane's crash in a field near Shanksville, Pennsylvania.

==== Alleged communications leak ====
CAMERA and JTA (Jewish Telegraphic Agency) criticized claims by Carl Cameron who stated, "certain suspects in the September 11th attacks may have managed to stay ahead of them by knowing who and when investigators are calling on the telephone," by using information from Amdocs Limited, an Israeli-based private communications company, and Comverse Infosys, another Israeli-run company that provides electronic eavesdropping technology for the U.S. government.

==== Israeli agents ====
It has been claimed that Israeli agents may have had foreknowledge of the attacks, and a persistent theory claimed Israeli and/or Jewish involvement. Four hours after the attack, the FBI arrested five Israelis who had been filming the smoking skyline from the roof of a white van in the parking lot of an apartment building. The Israelis were videotaping the events, and one bystander said they acted in a suspicious manner: "They were like happy, you know ... They didn't look shocked to me. I thought it was very strange." The van was found to be owned by an Israeli-owned company called Urban Moving Systems, and there was debate within the FBI as to whether it was providing cover for an Israeli intelligence operation to monitor fundraising and support networks in Muslim communities for Palestinian groups. The case was then moved to the FBI's Foreign Counterintelligence Section. According to a former CIA operations chief, "many people in the U.S. intelligence community believed that some of the men arrested were working for Israeli intelligence." A spokesperson for the Israeli Embassy in the United States said the men had not been involved in any intelligence operation in the United States, and the FBI eventually concluded that the five Israelis had no foreknowledge of the attacks.

=== World Trade Center collapse ===
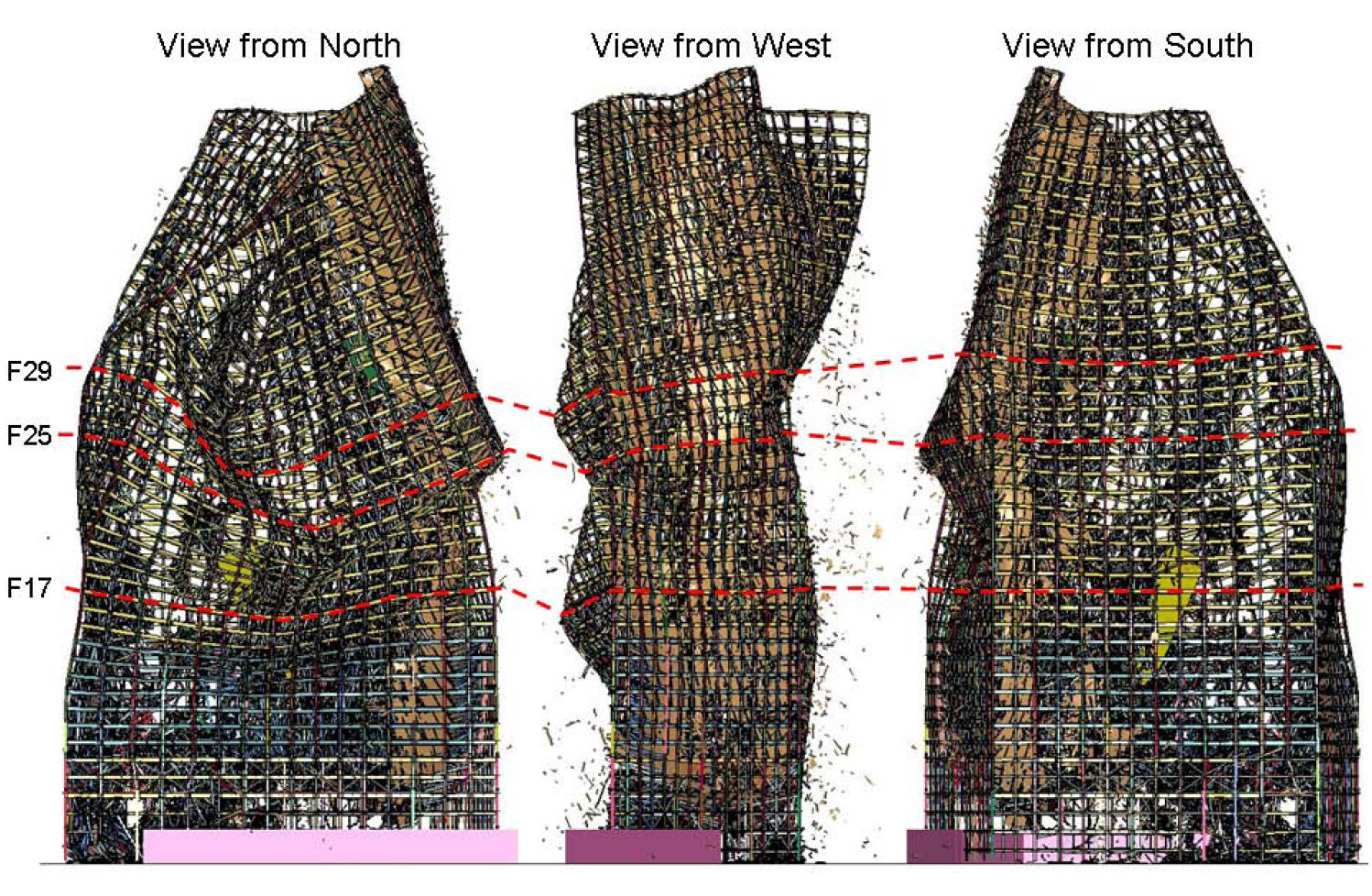
Criticism of the reports published by NIST on the destruction of the World Trade Center buildings plays a central role in theories about an alleged controlled demolition. The picture shows the simulated exterior buckling of 7 WTC during the collapse.

The collapse of the World Trade Center's North and South Towers was attributed by official investigations, including those conducted by the National Institute of Standards and Technology (NIST), to structural damage caused by the plane impacts and subsequent fires. 7 World Trade Center was not hit by a plane, but was heavily damaged by falling debris from the North Tower, which cut a large gash in its south side, and it burned for seven hours before collapsing. Controlled demolition conspiracy theories claim that all three buildings were brought down by pre-installed explosives, but these ideas have been widely dismissed by experts due to a lack of evidence.

Demolition theory proponents, such as physicist Steven E. Jones, architect Richard Gage, software engineer Jim Hoffman, and theologian David Ray Griffin, argue that the aircraft impacts and subsequent fires were insufficient to explain the catastrophic collapses of the Twin Towers and World Trade Center 7. Jones, in his paper, posits that evidence of thermite reactions points to controlled demolition as the cause. Gage presents architectural and engineering analyses arguing that fire alone could not have caused the observed structural failures. Hoffman disputes the official explanations, highlighting inconsistencies in the collapse dynamics. Griffin challenges mainstream attempts to refute these theories, contending that alternative explanations better account for the evidence.

In the article 'Active Thermitic Material Discovered in Dust from the 9/11 World Trade Center Catastrophe,' published in the Open Chemical Physics Journal, authors Niels Harrit of the University of Copenhagen's Department of Chemistry, Jeffrey Farrer of Brigham Young University's Department of Physics and Astronomy, Steven E. Jones, and others claim to have identified thermite and nano-thermite composites in the dust and debris following the collapse of the three World Trade Center buildings. However, this claim has been challenged by materials scientist Dr. James R. Millette, whose independent analysis, detailed in a technical report released in 2012, concluded that the red/gray chips examined were consistent with common construction materials, specifically a carbon steel coated with epoxy resin containing iron oxide and kaolin, used in building paint. Unlike Harrit et al.'s article, which was published in a peer-reviewed journal, Millette's report was not peer-reviewed but has been widely cited in discussions on the topic. Millette's findings cast doubt on the thermite hypothesis, suggesting the chips were not evidence of an explosive material. The article by Harrit et al. contained no formal scientific rebuttal at the time of publication, but the editor-in-chief of the Open Chemical Physics Journal later resigned, adding to the controversy surrounding the study.

Jones has not explained how the amount of explosive needed to bring down the buildings could have been positioned in the two buildings without drawing attention, but mentioned efforts to research the buildings' maintenance activity in the weeks prior to the event. Federal investigators at the National Institute of Standards and Technology state that enormous quantities of thermite would have to be applied to the structural columns to damage them, but Jones disputed this, saying that he and others were investigating "superthermite". Brent Blanchard, author of "A History of Explosive Demolition in America", who corresponded with Jones, states that questions about the viability of Jones' theories remain unanswered, such as the fact that no demolition personnel noticed any telltale signs of thermite during the eight months of debris removal following the towers' collapse. Blanchard also said that a verifiable chain of possession needs to be established for the tested beams, which did not occur with the beams Jones tested, raising questions of whether the metal pieces tested could have been cut away from the debris pile with acetylene torches, shears, or other potentially contaminated equipment while on site, or exposed to trace amounts of thermite or other compounds while being handled, while in storage, or while being transferred from Ground Zero to memorial sites.

Excavating equipment was cooled by water spray due to concerns about melting from underground fires.

Jones also said that molten steel found in the rubble was evidence of explosives, as an ordinary airplane fire would not generate enough heat to produce this, citing photographs of red debris being removed by construction equipment, but Blanchard said that if there had been any molten steel in the rubble any excavation equipment encountering it would have been immediately damaged. Other sampling of the pulverized dust by United States Geological Survey and RJ Lee did not report any evidence of thermite or explosives. It has been theorized the "thermite material" found was primer paint. Dave Thomas of Skeptical Inquirer magazine, noting that the residue in question was claimed to be thermotic because of its iron oxide and aluminum composition, pointed out that these substances are found in many items common to the towers. Thomas said that in order to cut through a vertical steel beam, special high-temperature containment must be added to prevent the molten iron from dropping down, and that the thermite reaction is too slow for it to be practically used in building demolition. Thomas pointed out that when Jesse Ventura hired New Mexico Tech to conduct a demonstration showing nanothermite slicing through a large steel beam, the nanothermite produced copious flame and smoke but no damage to the beam, even though it was in a horizontal, and therefore optimal, position.

The National Institute of Standards and Technology (NIST) concluded the accepted version was more than sufficient to explain the collapse of the buildings. NIST and many scientists have refused to debate conspiracy theorists because they feel it would give those theories unwarranted credibility. Specialists in structural mechanics and structural engineering accept the model of a fire-induced, gravity-driven collapse of the World Trade Center buildings without the use of explosives. As a result, NIST said that it did not perform any test for the residue of explosive compounds of any kind in the debris.

Soon after the day of the attacks, some major media sources reported (incorrectly) that the towers had collapsed due to heat melting the steel.

While the theoretical adiabatic flame temperature of kerosene is 2,093°C, this assumes perfect conditions, such as no heat loss and complete combustion in a stoichiometric mix of pure oxygen. In real-world conditions, such as burning kerosene in normal air, flame temperatures typically range from 260°C to 315°C. These temperatures are far below the melting point of structural steel (1,539°C). However, steel loses approximately 50% of its strength at 600°C and around 90% at 980°C. This weakening, combined with the removal of fireproofing by the initial impact and prolonged exposure to fire, may have contributed to the structural failures observed during the collapse of the World Trade Center towers.

Further, NIST did not claim that the steel melted, but rather that heat softened and weakened the steel, and that weakening, together with the damage caused by the planes' impacts, caused structural collapse. NIST reported that a simulation model based on the simple assumption that combustible vapors burned immediately upon mixing with the incoming air showed that "at any given location, the duration of gas temperatures near 1,000 °C was about 15 to 20 minutes. The rest of the time, the calculated temperatures were 500 °C or below."

=== Pentagon ===
Security camera footage of Flight 77 hitting the Pentagon (at 1:26 in the video)

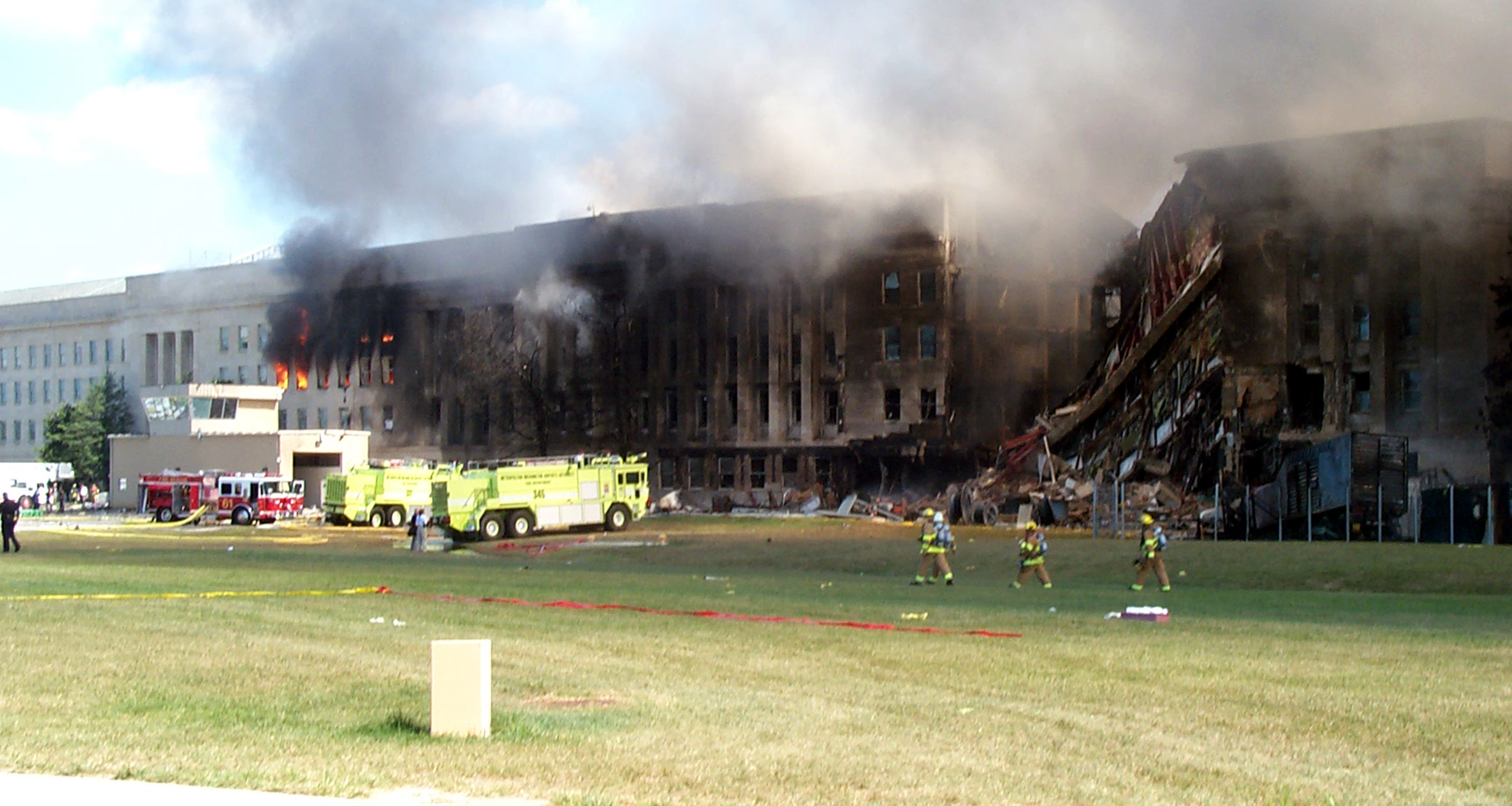
The Pentagon, after collapse of the damaged section

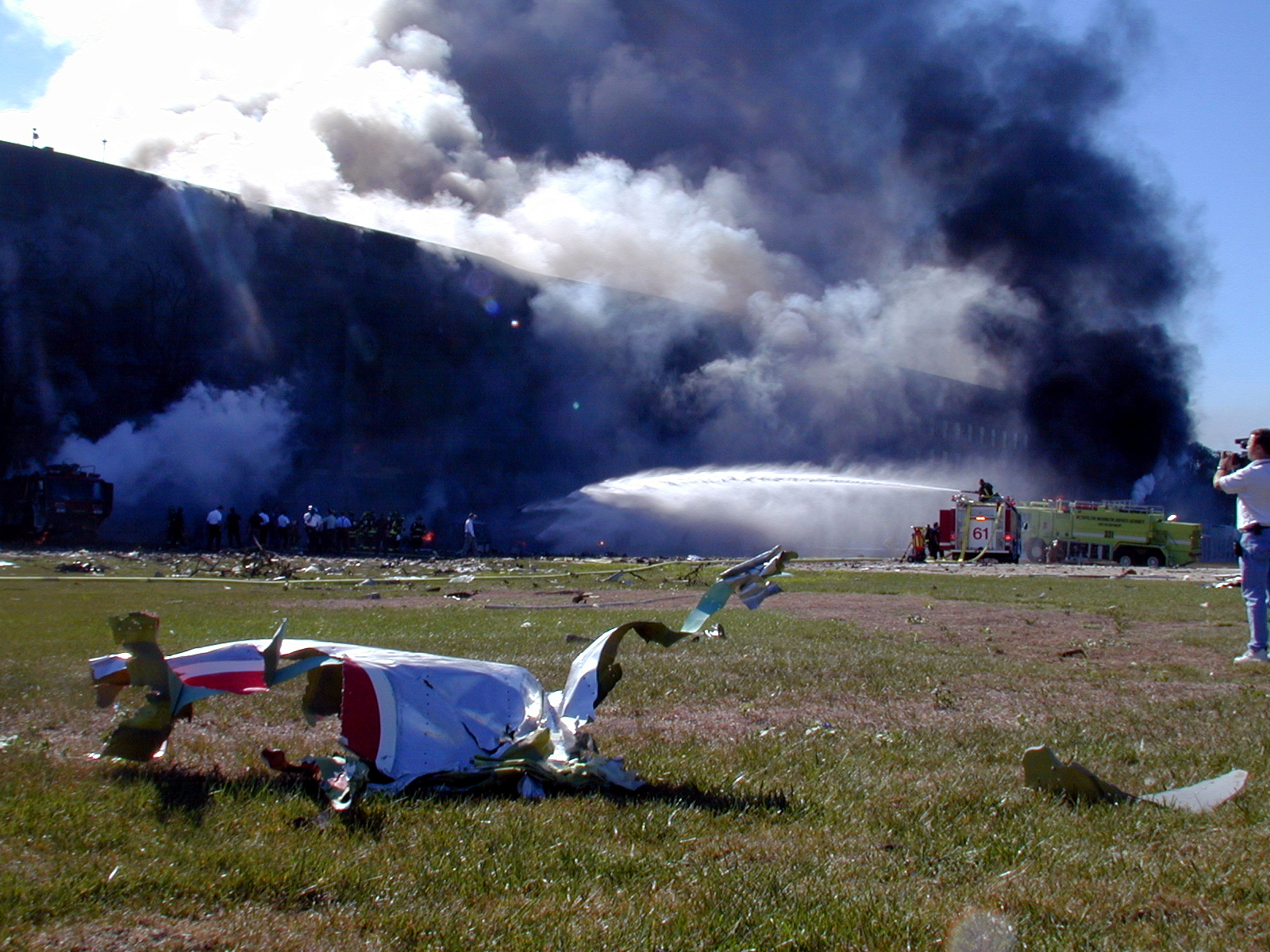
Airplane debris scattered near the Pentagon on the day of the attack

Political activist Thierry Meyssan and filmmaker Dylan Avery claim that American Airlines Flight 77 did not crash into the Pentagon. Instead, they argue that the Pentagon was hit by a missile launched by elements from inside the U.S. government. Some claim that the holes in the Pentagon walls were far too small to have been made by a Boeing 757: "How does a plane 125 ft. wide and 155 ft. long fit into a hole which is only 60 ft. across?" Meyssan's book, L'Effroyable Imposture (published in English as 9/11: The Big Lie) became available in more than a dozen languages. When released, the book was heavily criticized by both the mainstream French and American press, and later, from within the 9/11 Truth movement. The French newspaper Liberation called the book "a tissue of wild and irresponsible allegations, entirely without foundation."

In response to the conspiracy theorists' claim of a missile hitting the Pentagon, Mete Sozen, a professor of civil engineering at Purdue University argues that: "A crashing jet doesn't punch a cartoon-like outline of itself into a reinforced concrete building. When Flight 77 hit the Pentagon, one wing hit the ground and the other was sheared off by the Pentagon's load-bearing columns." According to ArchitectureWeek, the reason the Pentagon took relatively little damage from the impact was because Wedge One had recently been renovated. (This was part of a renovation program which had been begun in the 1980s, and Wedge One was the first of five to be renovated.)

Evidence contradicting some conspiracy theorists' claim of a missile hitting the Pentagon have been described by researchers within the 9/11 Truth Movement, such as Jim Hoffman, in his essay "The Pentagon Attack: What the Physical Evidence Shows", and by others broadly refuting the role of other conspiracies in the attacks. The evidence refuting missile claims includes airplane debris including Flight 77's black boxes, the nose cone, landing gear, an airplane tire, and an intact cockpit seat were observed at the crash site. The remains of passengers from Flight 77 were indeed found at the Pentagon crash site and their identities confirmed by DNA analysis. Foreign governments, such as the Chinese Foreign Ministry (FMPRC), also confirm the death of their citizens onboard Flight 77. Many eyewitnesses saw the plane strike the Pentagon, and multiple survivors of the impact zone of the Pentagon have described the smell of jet fuel from the crashed Flight 77 in their recollections of the attack. Further, Flight 77 passengers made phone calls reporting that their airplane had been hijacked. For example, passenger Renee May called her mother to tell her that the plane had been hijacked and that the passengers had been herded to the back of the plane. Another passenger named Barbara Olson called her husband (U.S. Solicitor General Theodore Olson) and said that the flight had been hijacked, and that the hijackers had knives and box cutters. Some conspiracy theories say the phone calls the passengers made were fabricated by voice morphing, the passengers' bodies disposed of, and a missile fired at the Pentagon.

The pressure group Judicial Watch filed a Freedom of Information Act request on December 15, 2004, to force the government to release video recordings from the Sheraton National Hotel, the Nexcomm/Citgo gas station, Pentagon security cameras and the Virginia Department of Transportation. On May 16, 2006, the government released the Pentagon security camera videos to Judicial Watch. The image of American Airlines Flight 77 which appears in the videos has been described as "[a] white blob" and "a white streak" (by the BBC), "a thin white blur" (by the Associated Press), and "a silver speck low to the ground" (in The Washington Post). A sequence of five frames from one of the videos already appeared in the media in 2002. Some conspiracy theorists believe the new video does not answer their questions.

=== Flight 93 ===
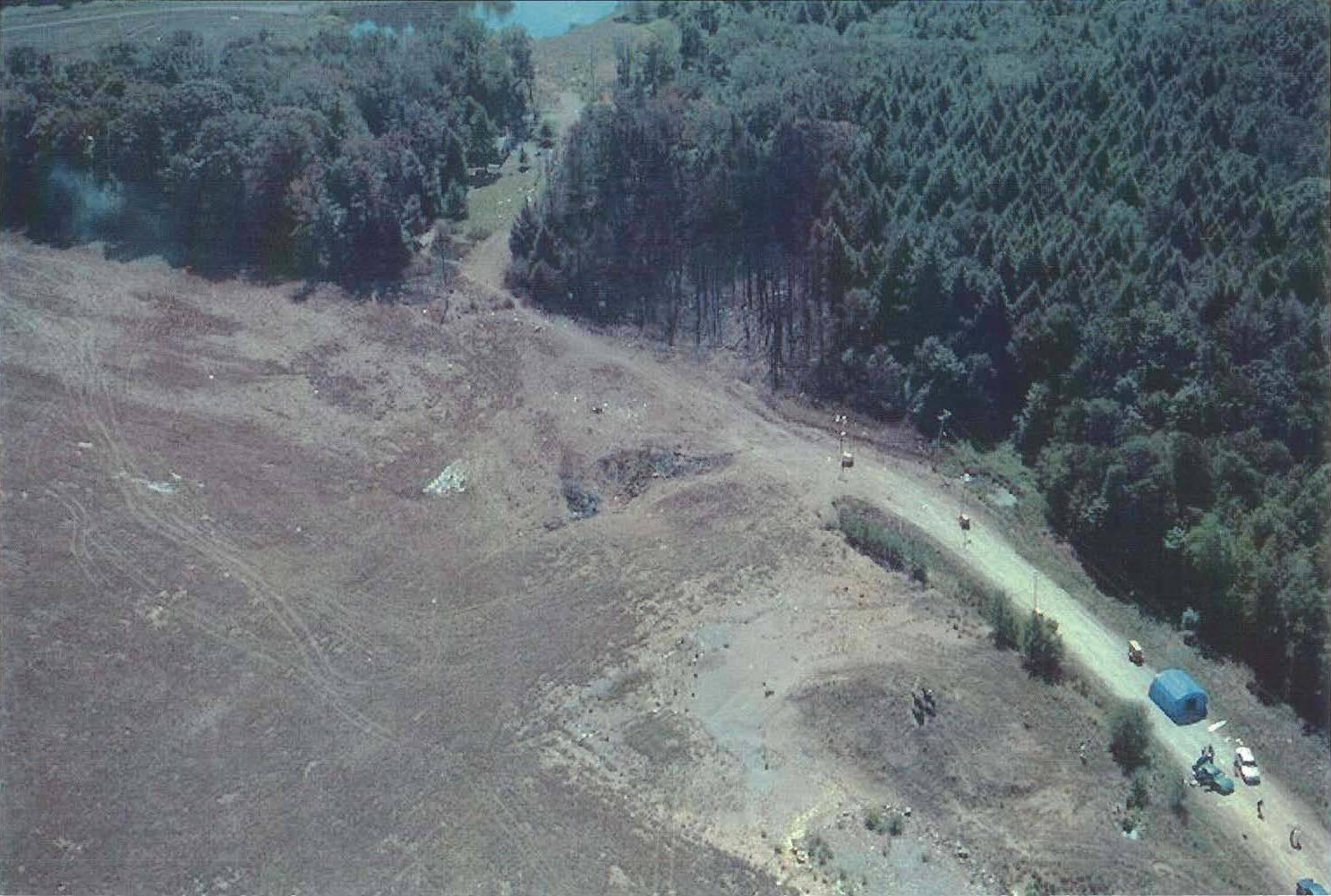
Flight 93 crash site

The fourth plane hijacked on 9/11, United Airlines Flight 93, crashed in an open field near Shanksville, Pennsylvania, after the passengers revolted. Out of the four planes hijacked on that day, Flight 93 was the only one not to reach its target.

One conspiracy theory surrounding this event is the claim that Flight 93 was shot down by a U.S. fighter jet. David Ray Griffin and Alex Jones have asserted that large parts of the plane, including the main body of the engine, landed miles away from the main wreckage site, too far away for an ordinary plane crash. Jones says that planes usually leave a small debris field when they crash, and that this is not compatible with reports of wreckage found farther away from the main crash site. One person claimed that the main body of the engine was found miles away from the main wreckage site with damage comparable to that which a heat-seeking missile would do to an airliner.

According to some theories, the plane had to be shot down by the government because passengers had found out about the alleged plot.

According to Phil Molé of Skeptic magazine, "[this] claim rests largely on unsupported assertions that the main body of the engine and other large parts of the plane turned up miles from the main wreckage site, too far away to have resulted from an ordinary crash. This claim is incorrect, because the engine was found only 300 yards from the main crash site, and its location was consistent with the direction in which the plane had been traveling." Michael K. Hynes, an airline accident expert who investigated the crash of TWA Flight 800 in 1996, says that, at very high velocities of 500 mph or more, it would only take a few seconds to move or tumble across the ground for 300 yards.

Reports of wreckage discovered at Indian Lake by local residents are accurate. CNN reported that investigators found debris from the crash at least eight miles away from the crash site, including in New Baltimore. According to CNN, this debris was all very light material that the wind would have easily blown away, and a Pittsburgh Post-Gazette article from September 14, 2001, describes the material as "mostly papers", "strands of charred insulation", and an "endorsed paycheck". The same article quotes FBI agent Bill Crowley that, "Lighter, smaller debris probably shot into the air on the heat of a fireball that witnesses said shot several hundred feet into the air after the jetliner crashed. Then, it probably rode a wind that was blowing southeast at about 9 m.p.h." Also, the distance between the crash site and Indian Lake was misreported in some accounts. According to the BBC, "In a straight line, Indian Lake is just over a mile from the crash site. The road between the two locations takes a roundabout route of 6.9 miles—accounting for the erroneous reports."

Some conspiracy theorists believe a small white jet seen flying over the crash area may have fired a missile to shoot down Flight 93. Government agencies such as the FBI assert this small plane was a Dassault Falcon business jet asked to descend to an altitude of around 1,500 ft to survey the impact. Ben Sliney, who was the FAA operation manager on September 11, 2001, says no military aircraft were near Flight 93.

Some internet videos, such as Loose Change, speculate that Flight 93 safely landed in Ohio, and a substituted plane was involved in the crash in Pennsylvania. Often cited is a preliminary news report that Flight 93 landed at a Cleveland airport; it was later learned that Delta Flight 1989 was the plane confused with Flight 93, and the report was retracted as inaccurate. Several websites within the 9/11 Truth Movement dispute this claim, citing the wreckage at the scene, eyewitness testimony, and the difficulty of secretly substituting one plane for another, and claim that such "hoax theories ... appear calculated to alienate victims' survivors and the larger public from the 9/11 truth movement". The editor of the article has since written a rebuttal to the claims.

Valencia McClatchey, a local woman who took the only photograph of the mushroom cloud from the impact of Flight 93 seconds after it hit the ground, says she has been harassed over the telephone and in person by conspiracy theorists, who claim she faked the photo. The FBI, the Somerset County authorities, the Smithsonian, and the National Park Service's Flight 93 National Memorial staff have all individually examined the photograph as well as the film negatives and all four agencies consider the photo to be authentic.

While some conspiracy theorists have claimed that passengers of Flight 93 and/or Flight 77 were murdered or that they were relocated, with the intent that they never be found, others within the 9/11 Truth Movement, such as Jim Hoffman and Scholars for 9/11 Truth & Justice, repudiate such claims.

=== Hijackers ===
During the initial confusion surrounding the immediate aftermath of the September 11 attacks, the BBC published the names and identities of what they believed to be some of the hijackers. Some of the people named were later discovered to be alive, a fact that was seized upon by 9/11 conspiracy theorists as proof that the hijackings were faked. The BBC explained that the initial confusion may have arisen because the names they reported back in 2001 were common Arabic and Islamic names. In response to a request from the BBC, the FBI said that it was confident to have identified all nineteen hijackers, and that none of the other inquiries had raised the issue of doubt about their identities. The New York Times also acknowledged these as cases of mistaken identity.

According to John Bradley, the former managing editor of Arab News in Jeddah, Saudi Arabia, the only public information about the hijackers was a list of names issued by the FBI on September 14, 2001. When the FBI released photographs four days after the cited reports on September 27, the mistaken identities were quickly resolved. According to Bradley, "all of this is attributable to the chaos that prevailed during the first few days following the attack. What we're dealing with are coincidentally identical names." In Saudi Arabia, says Bradley, the names of two of the allegedly surviving attackers, Said al-Ghamdi and Walid al-Shari, are "as common as John Smith in the United States or Great Britain."

According to Thomas Kean, chair of the 9/11 Commission, "Sixteen of the nineteen shouldn't have gotten into the United States in any way at all because there was something wrong with their visas, something wrong with their passports. They should simply have been stopped at the border. That was sixteen of the nineteen. Obviously, if even half of those people had been stopped, there never would have been a plot."

Khalid al-Mihdhar and Nawaf al-Hazmi had both been identified as al-Qaeda agents by the CIA, but that information was not shared with the FBI or U.S. Immigration, so both men were able to legally enter the U.S. to prepare for the 9/11 attacks.

=== Foreign governments ===
There are allegations that individuals within the Pakistani Inter-Services Intelligence (ISI) may have played an important role in financing the attacks. There are also claims that other foreign intelligence agencies, such as the Israeli Mossad, had foreknowledge of the attacks, and that some Saudi officials may have played a role in financing the attacks. General Hamid Gul, a former head of ISI, believes the attacks were an "inside job" originating in the United States, perpetrated by Israel or neo-conservatives. Francesco Cossiga, former President of Italy from 1985 until his 1992 resignation over Operation Gladio, said that it is common knowledge among the Italian center-left that the 9/11 attacks were a joint operation of the CIA and the Mossad. Subsequent reports indicated that he did not actually believe this.

==== Israel ====
A conspiracy theory documented by the Anti-Defamation League, Thom Burnett and others is that the state of Israel was involved in the attacks, and may have planned them. A variety of motives are suggested, including: to cause the United States to attack enemies of Israel; to divert public attention away from Israel's treatment of the Palestinians; to help Zionists take control of world affairs; and to persuade Americans to support Israel. Variants of the theory contend that the attack was organized by then-Israeli prime minister Ariel Sharon, the intelligence agency Mossad, or other actors from the Israeli government. According to Slate, Kevin Barrett, a former lecturer at the University of Wisconsin, is a "leading advocate of theories that Israel's Mossad orchestrated the 9/11 attacks."

Some proponents of this theory believe that Jewish employees were forewarned by Israeli intelligence to skip work on September 11, resulting in no Jewish deaths at the World Trade Center. According to Cinnamon Stillwell, some 9/11 conspiracy theorists put this number as high as 4,000 Jewish people skipping work. This was first reported on September 17 by the Hezbollah-owned Lebanese satellite television channel Al-Manar, and is believed to be based on the September 12 edition of The Jerusalem Post which said "The Foreign Ministry in Jerusalem has so far received the names of 4,000 Israelis believed to have been in the areas of the World Trade Center and the Pentagon at the time of the attacks."

The number of Jews who died in the attacks is variously estimated at between 270 and 400. (Note: A survey of the 1,700 victims whose religion was listed found approximately 10% were Jewish indicating around 270 in total. A survey based on the last names of victims found that around 400 (15 1/2%) were possibly Jewish. A survey of 390 Cantor Fitzgerald employees who had public memorials (out of the 658 who died) found 49 were Jewish (12 1/2%). According to the 2002 American Jewish Year Book, New York State's population was 9% Jewish. Sixty-four percent of the WTC victims lived in New York State.) The lower figure tracks closely with the percentage of Jews living in the New York area and partial surveys of the victims' listed religion. The U.S. State Department has published a partial list of 76, in response to claims that fewer Jews or Israelis died in the WTC attacks than should have been present at the time. Five Israeli citizens died in the attack.

==== Antisemitism in conspiracy theories ====
In 2003, the Anti-Defamation League (ADL) published a report attacking "hateful conspiracy theories" that the 9/11 attacks were carried about by Israelis and Jews, saying they had the potential to "rationalize and fuel global antisemitism." It found that such theories were widely accepted in the Arab and Muslim world, as well as in Europe and the United States.

The ADL's report found that "The Big Lie has united American far-right extremists and white supremacists and elements within the Arab and Muslim world". It asserted that many of the theories were modern manifestation of the 19th-century Protocols of the Elders of Zion, which purported to map out a Jewish conspiracy for world domination. The ADL has characterized the Jeff Rense website as carrying antisemitic materials, such as "American Jews staged the 9/11 terrorist attacks for their own financial gain and to induce the American people to endorse wars of aggression and genocide on the nations of the Middle East and the theft of their resources for the benefit of Israel".

Pedro A. Sanjuan, a former United Nations diplomat, alleged that antisemitic 9/11 conspiracy theories were quite common at high levels of the organization following the attacks.

==== Saudi Arabia ====
British investigative journalists Anthony Summers and Robbyn Swan claimed in their 2011 book The Eleventh Day that the Saudi Royal Family provided material and financial support to the hijackers and that the Bush Administration covered this up as well as their own alleged incompetence. The authors claim the 9/11 Truth movement helped this coverup by deflecting attention away from these actions. In September 2011 a "Lloyd's insurance syndicate" began legal action against Saudi Arabia demanding the repayment of £136m it paid out to victims of the 9/11 attacks. A number of prominent Saudi charities and banks as well as a leading member of the al-Saud royal family were accused of being "agents and alter egos" for the Saudi state that "knowingly" provided funding to al-Qaeda and encouraged anti-Western sentiment.

Such theories have historically revolved around the putative content of the 28 pages of the 2002 report of the U.S. Congress Joint Inquiry that were withheld from publication until July 15, 2016.

Former Florida Senator Bob Graham, co-chairman of the Joint Inquiry, as well as other former officials who did read the entire version of the Joint Inquiry's report, claimed that there was a U.S. government coverup on the Saudi officials' assistance provided to the perpetrators of the 9/11 attacks, notably the role of Fahad al-Thumairy, a diplomat at the Saudi consulate in Los Angeles.

=== No-planes theory ===
The "no-plane theory", promoted via Internet videos, claims that this shot of the second impact, taken from a news helicopter, depicts a video composite of a Boeing 767 accidentally appearing from behind a layer mask.

Former chief economist within the Labor Department under the Bush administration, Morgan Reynolds, argues that no planes were used in the attacks. Reynolds claims it is physically impossible that the Boeing planes of Flights 11 and 175 could have penetrated the steel frames of the Towers, and that digital compositing was used to depict the plane crashes in both news reports and subsequent amateur video. "There were no planes, there were no hijackers", Reynolds insists. "I know, I know, I'm out of the mainstream, but that's the way it is". According to David Shayler, "the only explanation is that they were missiles surrounded by holograms made to look like planes", he says (although that would be well beyond the capabilities of contemporaneous hologram technology). "Watch footage frame by frame and you will see a cigar-shaped missile hitting the World Trade Center". Most no-planes adherents, including Thierry Meyssan and Reynolds, assert that either CGI of a passenger plane was overlaid onto a winged cruise missile or military aircraft, or that computer-generated images of a passenger plane were inserted into the video footage and plane-shaped explosive cut-outs were planted in the buildings in order to create the impression of plane impact. Some truth movement veterans have repeatedly refuted the "no-plane" claims. In fact, discussion of no-plane theories has been banned from certain conspiracy theory websites and advocates have sometimes been threatened with violence by posters at other conspiracy theory websites.

== Cover-up allegations ==
=== Cockpit recorders ===
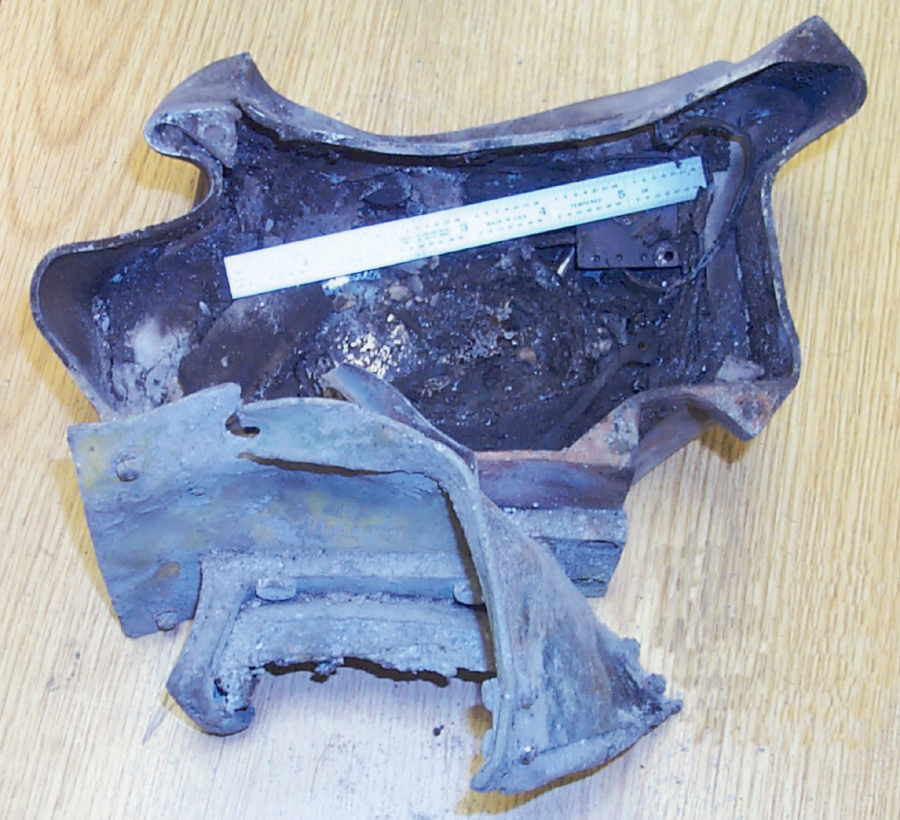
The cockpit voice recorder from Flight 77 was heavily damaged from the impact and resulting fire.

According to the 9/11 Commission Report, both black boxes from Flight 77 and both black boxes from Flight 93 were recovered. Flight 77's CVR was said to be too damaged to yield any data. On April 18, 2002, the FBI allowed the families of victims from Flight 93 to listen to the voice recordings. In April 2006, a transcript of the CVR was released as part of the Zacarias Moussaoui trial.

Michael Bellone and Nicholas DeMasi, two men who worked extensively in the wreckage of the World Trade Center, said in the book Behind-The-Scenes: Ground Zero that they helped federal agents find three of the four "black boxes" from the jetliners:

At one point, I was assigned to take Federal Agents around the site to search for the black boxes from the planes. We were getting ready to go out. My ATV was parked at the top of the stairs at the Brooks Brothers entrance area. We loaded up about a million dollars worth of equipment and strapped it into the ATV. There were a total of four black boxes. We found three.

=== Bin Laden tapes ===
A series of interviews, audio and videotapes were released in the years following the 9/11 attacks that were reported to be from Osama bin Laden. In the first of these the speaker denied responsibility for the attacks. On September 17, 2001, in a statement issued to Al Jazeera, Bin Laden is quoted as saying: "The U.S. government has consistently blamed me for being behind every occasion its enemies attack it. I would like to assure the world that I did not plan the recent attacks, which seems to have been planned by people for personal reasons." Some observers, especially people in the Muslim world, doubted the authenticity of the tape. On December 20, 2001, German TV channel Das Erste broadcast an analysis of the White House's translation of the videotape. On the program Monitor, two independent translators and an expert on Oriental Studies found the White House's translation to be both inaccurate and manipulative, stating, "At the most important places where it is held to prove the guilt of bin Laden, it is not identical with the Arabic", and that the words used that indicate foreknowledge can not be heard at all in the original. Prof. Gernot Rotter, professor of Islamic and Arabic Studies at the Asia-Africa Institute at the University of Hamburg, said "The American translators who listened to the tapes and transcribed them apparently wrote a lot of things in that they wanted to hear but that cannot be heard on the tape no matter how many times you listen to it." Some members of Scholars for 9/11 Truth believe that the man in this videotape is not Osama bin Laden at all, citing differences in weight and facial features, along with his wearing of a gold ring, which is forbidden by Muslim law, and writing with his right hand although bin Laden was left-handed.

In an audiotape released in November 2007, Bin Laden claimed responsibility for the attacks and denied the Taliban and the Afghan government or people had any prior knowledge of the attacks. In an interview with Al Jazeera, Khalid Sheikh Mohammed and Ramzi bin al-Shibh, two of al-Qaeda's alleged masterminds of the attacks, also confessed their involvement in the attacks.

=== CIA recruitment efforts ===
Richard Clarke, who headed the government's anti-terrorism efforts in 2001, theorized CIA director George Tenet ordered the agency to withhold information about Nawaf al-Hazmi and Khalid al-Mihdhar from the rest of the government in an effort to cover up the agency's recruitment of the two. George Tenet released a statement denying the agency deliberately withheld information about the pair and noted Clarke himself said he had no proof.

== Motives ==
=== Pax Americana ===
In September 2000 the Project for a New American Century (PNAC) released a strategic treatise entitled Rebuilding America's Defences. The Defense Planning Guidance of 1992, was drafted by Paul Wolfowitz on behalf of then Secretary of Defense Dick Cheney. This was described as "a blueprint for permanent American global hegemony" by Andrew Bacevich in his book American Empire: The Realities and Consequences of U.S. Diplomacy.

Matt Taibbi argued in his book The Great Derangement that conspiracy theorists have taken what is written in the paper "completely out of context", and that the "transformation" referenced in the paper is explicitly said to be a decades-long process to turn the Cold War-era military into a "new, modern military" which could deal with more localized conflicts. He said that, for this to be evidence of motive, either those responsible would have decided to openly state their objectives, or would have read the paper in 2000 and quickly laid the groundwork for the 9/11 attacks using it as inspiration.

=== Invasions ===
Conspiracy theorists have questioned whether The Oil Factor and 9/11 provided the United States and the United Kingdom with a reason to launch a war they had wanted for some time, and suggest that this gives them a strong motive for either carrying out the attacks, or allowing them to take place. For instance, Andreas von Bülow, a former research minister in the German government, has argued that 9/11 was staged to justify the subsequent wars in Afghanistan and Iraq. Former Malaysian prime minister Mahathir Mohamad was quoted as saying that there was "strong evidence" that the attacks were faked so that the United States could go to war against Muslims. In spite of these allegations, the Bush administration specifically rejected proposals to immediately attack Iraq in response to 9/11, and acknowledged that there was no evidence of Iraqi involvement in the attacks.

=== Financial cover-up ===
Viral claims have asserted that the US government orchestrated the attacks in order to cover-up its losses of $2.3 trillion of taxpayer funds. The then-Secretary of Defense Donald Rumsfeld gave a speech on September 10, 2001, claiming the following:

The technology revolution has transformed organizations across the private sector. But not ours, not fully, not yet. We are, as they say, tangled in our anchor chain. Our financial systems are decades old. According to some estimates, we cannot track $2.3 trillion in transactions.

Rumsfeld wasn't saying the Department of Defense lost $2.3 trillion. He was using the number to illustrate that the department was having trouble keeping track of its finances and its spent budget because of outdated technology. Moreover, while Rumsfeld did reference the figure the day before 9/11, it was not new information: The figure was included in a February 2000 audit report for fiscal year 1999 by the Defense Department's inspector general, which noted: "For the accounting entries, $2.3 trillion was not supported by adequate audit trails or sufficient evidence to determine their validity." However, Rumsfeld's remarks have fueled conspiracy theories for decades.

=== New World Order ===
Alex Jones and other personalities hold that 9/11 was initiated by a disparate variety of banking, corporate, globalization, and military interests for the purpose of creating a globalist government. Such New World Order conspiracy theories predate 9/11.

== Suggested historical precedents ==
Conspiracy theorists often point to Operation Northwoods as a model for the 9/11 attacks, theorizing the attacks were carried out by the U.S. government as a false flag operation and then blamed on Islamic extremists. Operation Northwoods was an unimplemented, apparently rejected, plan approved by the United States Joint Chiefs of Staff in 1962. One proposal in the plan suggested that covert operatives commit multiple acts of terrorism in U.S. cities and blame Cuba, thus providing a pretext for invasion.

Time magazine contrasted events which inspired past conspiracy theories with those that inspire 9/11 conspiracy theories such as the assassination of John F. Kennedy. Time called the public assassination of Kennedy a "private, intimate affair" when compared with the attack on the World Trade Center, which was witnessed by millions of people and documented by hundreds of videographers; and said, "there is no event so plain and clear that a determined human being can't find ambiguity in it."

== Proponents ==
Many individuals and organizations that support or discuss 9/11 conspiracy theories consider themselves to be part of the 9/11 Truth movement.

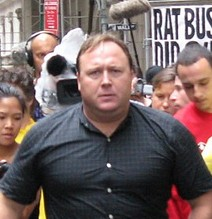
Alex Jones at a 9/11 Truth Movement event in 2007

Prominent adherents of the movement include, among others, radio talk show host Alex Jones, theologian David Ray Griffin, physicist Steven E. Jones, software engineer Jim Hoffman, architect Richard Gage (of Architects & Engineers for 9/11 Truth), film producer Dylan Avery, former Governor of Minnesota Jesse Ventura, former member of the U.S. House of Representatives Cynthia McKinney, actors Daniel Sunjata, Ed Asner, and Charlie Sheen, political science professor Joseph Diaferia and journalist Thierry Meyssan. Adherents of the 9/11 Truth movement come from diverse social backgrounds. The movement draws adherents from people of diverse political beliefs including liberals, conservatives, and libertarians. The Anti-Defamation League has named Alan Sabrosky as a key figure in antisemitic 9/11 conspiracy theories.

Among the organizations that actively discuss and promote such theories are Architects & Engineers for 9/11 Truth, a group that focuses on the collapse of the World Trade Center buildings; 9/11 Truth, founded in 2004; Scholars for 9/11 Truth, founded in 2005, and Scholars for 9/11 Truth & Justice, a group that split from Scholars for 9/11 Truth in 2007 and runs the online publication Journal of 9/11 Studies; 9/11 Citizens Watch, which was already formed in 2002; and the Hispanic Victims Group. Several of these groups have collected signatures on petitions asking for further investigation of the September 11 attacks.

In 2004, John Buchanan ran for president on a "9/11 Truth" platform.

9/11 conspiracy theory critic Jonathan Kay asserts that for the most part proponents are not out for financial gain and in some cases have left lucrative careers to become activists.

Dr. Michael Wood and Dr. Karen Douglas, University of Kent psychologists who specialize in conspiracy theories, examined the comments sections of over 2,000 news articles relating to the collapse of 7 World Trade Center. They found that proponents of 9/11 conspiracy theories were more likely to try and debunk the mainstream account than promote their own theories and also were more likely to believe in other conspiracy theories. Proponents of the mainstream account tended to argue for that account and showed a greater hostility toward conspiracy theory proponents.

=== Analysis ===
According to a 2011 analysis in a Skeptical Inquirer article, people involved in this movement, which seemingly is a disparate group with very diversified backgrounds, could be classified into three groups. They join the movement for different reasons, loosely self-assemble to fill different roles and are united by their shared mistrust in experts and the establishment (government and reputable sources of knowledge), and conspiratorial stance. Through their engagement, they each find their own fulfillment and satisfaction. Together, they contribute to the persistence, resilience and exaggerated claims of acceptance (in general public) of the movement. These three groups are:

- Hard core: The organizers and active members of the various 9/11 Truth Movement organizations. They produce the information, spot the anomalies and technical inconsistencies, provide the technical base and form the theories. While they claim to be only interested in facts and to use scientific method, they commit the logical fallacy of 'confirmation bias' by pre-determining the outcome, then searching for corroborating evidence while ignoring the vast body of peer-reviewed, independent, consensual research which contradict their theories. They supply the physical structure of the movement by organizing events, seminars, discussions, marches and distributing flyers and pamphlets. Their numbers are relatively small but they are tight-knit and highly connected. Their worldview favors 'super-conspiracy', a master plan that is behind conspiracies which they believe they are uncovering.
- Critically turned: They are the young students and political activists whose affiliation with the 9/11 Truth Movement often is rooted from their dissatisfaction and anger at the established political and social order. Their sense of justice and idealism propels them to activism against perceived oppression and social injustice. Their penchant to use Internet, especially social media, and tech savvy make them the propaganda machine for the movement. They produce YouTube videos and films with cool, countercultural content, make good use of pop culture parody and eye-catching graphics. The countercultural street cred of their productions buy them broad appeal and exposure to millions of people.
- Illiterati: They are the movement's mass membership backbone, a large, diffuse group which give the movement exaggerated claims of popularity and influence. Participation in the 9/11 Truth Movement, to this group of people, is as much a social and recreational pursuit as the quest for truth. Their partaking is mostly through web 2.0 social networking and YouTube. Their commentaries often are emotional and they make no pretense to be accurate, balanced or to show genuine intent to find truth. Involvement with the movement that fit their worldview gives them a sense of identity and belonging, which they find more appealing than the facts and evidences of the 9/11 terrorist attack itself.

== Media reaction ==
While discussion and coverage of these theories is mainly confined to Internet pages, books, documentary films, and conversation, a number of mainstream news outlets around the world have covered the issue.

The Norwegian version of the July 2006 Le Monde diplomatique sparked interest when they ran, on their own initiative, a three-page main story on the 9/11 attacks and summarized the various types of 9/11 conspiracy theories (which were not specifically endorsed by the newspaper, only recensed). In December 2006, the French version published an article by Alexander Cockburn, co-editor of CounterPunch, which strongly criticized the alleged endorsement of conspiracy theories by the U.S. left-wing, alleging that it was a sign of "theoretical emptiness."

Also, on the Canadian website for CBC News: The Fifth Estate, a program titled, "Conspiracy Theories: uncovering the facts behind the myths of Sept. 11, 2001" was broadcast on October 29, 2003, stating that what they found may be more surprising than any theories. On November 27, 2009, The Fifth Estate aired a documentary entitled The Unofficial Story where several prominent members of the 9/11 Truth Movement made their case.

An article in the September 11, 2006, edition of Time magazine comments that the major 9/11 conspiracy theories "depend on circumstantial evidence, facts without analysis or documentation, quotes taken out of context and the scattered testimony of traumatized eyewitnesses", and enjoy continued popularity because "the idea that there is a malevolent controlling force orchestrating global events is, in a perverse way, comforting". It concludes that "conspiracy theories are part of the process by which Americans deal with traumatic public events" and constitute "an American form of national mourning."

Australian newspaper The Daily Telegraph published an article titled "The CIA couldn't have organised this ..." which said "The same people who are making a mess of Iraq were never so clever or devious that they could stage a complex assault on two narrow towers of steel and glass" and "if there is a nefarious plot in all this bad planning, it is one improvised by a confederacy of dunces". This article mainly attacked a group of scientists led by Professor Steven E. Jones, now called Scholars for 9/11 Truth and Justice. They said "most of them aren't scientists but instructors ... at second-rate colleges".

The Daily Telegraph also published an article in May 2007 that was highly critical of Loose Change 2, a movie which presents a 9/11 conspiracy theory.

Doug MacEachern in a May 2008 column for The Arizona Republic wrote that while many "9/11 truthers" are not crackpots that espouse "crackpot conspiracy theories", supporters of the theories fail to take into account both human nature and that nobody has come forward claiming they were participants in the alleged conspiracies. This view was seconded by Timothy Giannuzzi, a Calgary Herald op-ed columnist specializing in foreign policy.

On June 7, 2008, the Financial Times published a lengthy article on the 9/11 Truth Movement and 9/11 conspiracy theories.

Charlie Brooker, a British comedian and multimedia personality, in a July 2008 column published by The Guardian as part of its "Comment is free" series agreed that 9/11 conspiracy theorists fail to take in account human fallacies and added that believing in these theories gives theorists a sense of belonging to a community that shares privileged information thus giving the theorists a delusional sense of power. The commentary generated over 1700 online responses, the largest in the history of the series. In a September 2009 piece, The Guardian was more supportive of 9/11 conspiracy theories, asking, "when did it become uncool to ask questions? When did questioners become imbeciles?"

On September 12, 2008, Russian State Television broadcast in prime time a documentary made by Member of the European Parliament Giulietto Chiesa entitled Zero, sympathetic to those who question the accepted account of the attacks according to Chiesa. According to Thierry Meyssan in conjunction with the documentary, Russian State Television aired a debate on the subject. The panel consisted of members from several countries including 12 Russians who hold divergent views. The motive of Russian State Television in broadcasting the documentary was questioned by a commentator from The Other Russia who noted that Russian State Television had a history of broadcasting programs involving conspiracy theories involving the United States government.

Nasir Mahmood in a commentary printed by the Pakistan Observer wrote favorably about a 9/11 truth lecture and film festival held in California and quoted a Jewish speaker at that festival who said that none of the 19 suspected hijackers had been proven guilty of anything and compared racism against Muslims resulting from what he called false accusations to the racism against Jews in the Nazi era.

On November 10, 2008, ITN broadcast a story summarizing various 9/11 conspiracy theories.

The emergence of the birther movement in 2009 has led to comparisons between that movement and the 9/11 Truth movement, with both movements seen in a very negative light. Moon landing conspiracy theories have also been compared to the birther and 9/11 conspiracy theories. James Borne, a journalist for The New York Times who covered the September 11 attacks, described his assignment covering a 9/11 truth meeting as "[p]erhaps the most intellectually scary assignment I have had in recent years".

On August 31, 2009, the National Geographic Channel aired the program 9/11 Science and Conspiracy, in which the Energetic Materials Research and Testing Center tested some of the claims frequently made by those who question the accepted 9/11 account. Specifically, the experiments concluded that burning jet fuel alone can sufficiently raise the temperature of a steel support column to the point of structural failure, that a controlled demolition using conventional techniques would leave clear evidence that was not found at Ground Zero, that using thermite is not an effective technique to melt a steel column, and that even if thermite chemical signatures were found, it would be impossible to tell if thermite was actually used or if the traces came from the reaction of aircraft aluminum with other substances in the fire. The testing also concluded that the type of hole found at the Pentagon was consistent with the standard scenario, and that damage from a bombing or missile attack would differ from the damage that occurred. In the program, several prominent 9/11 conspiracy theorists viewed rough edits of the experiments, and expressed their disagreement with the findings.

The British left wing magazine New Statesman listed David Ray Griffin as the 41st most important person who matters today. The magazine said that Griffin's "books on the subject have lent a sheen of respectability that appeals to people at the highest levels of government". The publication listed 9/11 conspiracy theories as "one of the most pernicious global myths". Griffin's book The New Pearl Harbor Revisited was chosen by Publishers Weekly as a "Pick of the Week" in November 2008.

Denver public television KBDI-TV has aired 9/11 truth documentaries several times. The stations spokesperson claimed airing these documentaries has been a boon for the stations fund raising efforts.

Glenn Beck, television and radio host, said of the allegations: "There are limits to debasement of this country, aren't there? I mean, it's one thing to believe that our politicians are capable of being Bernie Madoff. It's another to think that they are willing to kill 3,000 Americans. Once you cross that line, you're in a whole new territory."

In March 2010, The Washington Post editorialized against Yukihisa Fujita, a prominent Japanese politician who has espoused 9/11 conspiracy theories. They described Fujita as a man "susceptible to the imaginings of the lunatic fringe". It went on to say that the U.S.–Japan alliance would be "severely tested" if Fujita's party continued to tolerate these kinds of comments.

For the ninth anniversary of the attacks the Egyptian daily Al-masry Al-youm published an article questioning the U.S. Government story and promoting conspiracy theories. The senior analyst for the semi-official Al-Ahram Center for Political and Strategic Studies and a member of Parliament from the Muslim Brotherhood was quoted.

Gordon Farrer, the technology editor for The Age, theorized in a November 2010 column for the Sydney Morning Herald that the popularity of 9/11 conspiracy theories was a result of two main factors. One revolved around the personality traits of the theorists themselves (cynical, anxious, belief that they are freethinkers). The second revolved around the high internet search ranking 9/11 conspiracy theories receive, leading to a false air of authority to the theories. Speaking of the theorists. Farrer wrote that "when politicians and media don't give them voice they feel more threatened, more suspicious, cornered, helpless; and so they go on the attack".

Geraldo Rivera, the host of Geraldo at Large, a news magazine run by Fox News Channel, expressed openness to questions on causes of the collapse of 7 World Trade Center. Andrew Napolitano, a legal analyst for Fox News and former judge at the New Jersey Superior Court, voiced support for skepticism about the collapse of the high-rise building, and for Rivera investigating the event.

Alex Jones syndicated radio program was dropped by 70 radio stations when he began espousing 9/11 conspiracy theories. On August 29, 2010, BBC Two broadcast a program entitled The Conspiracy Files: 9/11 – Ten Years On.

On September 5, 2011, The Guardian published an article entitled, "9/11 conspiracy theories debunked". The article noted that unlike the collapse of World Trade Centers 1 and 2 a controlled demolition collapses a building from the bottom and explains that the windows popped because of collapsing floors. The article also said there are conspiracy theories that claim that 7 World Trade Center was also downed by a controlled demolition, that the Pentagon being hit by a missile, that the hijacked planes were packed with explosives and flown by remote control, that Israel was behind the attacks, that a plane headed for the Pentagon was shot down by a missile, that there was insider trading by people who had foreknowledge of the attacks were all false.

Toure Neblett, who has tweeted his suspicions about the attack on the Pentagon, is one of the hosts of the MSNBC program The Cycle, which debuted on June 25, 2012.

== Criticism ==
Critics of these conspiracy theories say they are a form of conspiracism common throughout history after a traumatic event in which conspiracy theories emerge as a mythic form of explanation. A related criticism addresses the form of research on which the theories are based. Thomas W. Eagar, an engineering professor at MIT, suggested they "use the 'reverse scientific method'. They determine what happened, throw out all the data that doesn't fit their conclusion, and then hail their findings as the only possible conclusion." Eagar's criticisms also exemplify a common stance that the theories are best ignored. "I've told people that if the argument gets too mainstream, I'll engage in the debate." According to him, this happened when Steve Jones, a physics professor at Brigham Young University, took up the issue.

Michael Shermer, writing in Scientific American, said: "The mistaken belief that a handful of unexplained anomalies can undermine a well-established theory lies at the heart of all conspiratorial thinking. All the evidence for a 9/11 conspiracy falls under the rubric of this fallacy. Such notions are easily refuted by noting that scientific theories are not built on single facts alone but on a convergence of evidence assembled from multiple lines of inquiry."

Scientific American, Popular Mechanics, and The Skeptic's Dictionary have published articles that rebut various 9/11 conspiracy theories. Popular Mechanics has published a book entitled Debunking 9/11 Myths that expands upon the research first presented in the article. In the foreword for the book Senator John McCain wrote that blaming the U.S. government for the events "mars the memories of all those lost on that day" and "exploits the public's anger and sadness. It shakes Americans' faith in their government at a time when that faith is already near an all-time low. It trafficks in ugly, unfounded accusations of extraordinary evil against fellow Americans." Der Spiegel dismissed 9/11 conspiracy theories as a "panoply of the absurd", stating "as diverse as these theories and their adherents may be, they share a basic thought pattern: great tragedies must have great reasons."

Journalist Matt Taibbi, in his book The Great Derangement, discusses 9/11 conspiracy theories as symptomatic of what he calls the "derangement" of American society; a disconnection from reality due to widespread "disgust with our political system". Drawing a parallel with the Charismatic Movement, he argues that both "chose to battle bugbears that were completely idiotic, fanciful, and imaginary," instead of taking control of their own lives. While critical, Taibbi explains that 9/11 conspiracy theories are different from "Clinton-era black-helicopter paranoia", and constitute more than "a small, scattered group of nutcases [...] they really were, just as they claim to be, almost everyone you meet."

David Aaronovitch, a columnist for The Times, in his book entitled Voodoo Histories: The Role of the Conspiracy Theory in Shaping Modern History that was published in May 2009, claimed that the theories strain credulity. He charges that 9/11 conspiracy theorists have exaggerated the expertise of those supporting their theories, and says 9/11 conspiracy theorists, including David Ray Griffin, cross-cite each other. He also claims the popularity of 9/11 conspiracy theories has hurt the war on terror. According to Aaronovitch, because a significant portion of educated Pakistanis believe that George W. Bush brought the towers down, dealing with the Taliban is difficult "because they actually don't believe the fundamental premise on which the war against terror was waged".

Harvard law professor Cass Sunstein co-authored a 2009 paper which used members of the 9/11 Truth movement and others as examples of people who suffer from "crippled epistemologies", to public trust and the political system. He wrote that "[t]hey do not merely undermine democratic debate [...] In extreme cases, they create or fuel violence. If government can dispel such theories, it should do so."

In June 2011, the Royal Institute of British Architects (RIBA) was criticized for hosting a lecture by Richard Gage, president of Architects & Engineers for 9/11 Truth. Rick Bell, the director of the American Institute of Architects (AIA) New York chapter, who was a witness to the 9/11 attacks, said that "no amount of money" would persuade him to allow the group to talk at his headquarters and said that Gage lacks credibility among the professional community. Eugine Kohn, former spokesperson for the AIA, said Gage's theories were "ridiculous", "[t]here were no explosives planted", and "[t]he buildings were definitely brought down by the planes". The decision to host the event was also criticized by the former president of RIBA and the founding president of the AIA's United Kingdom chapter. Gage has been warned by the AIA against giving a false impression that he has a relationship with it. A July 2012 article in the AIA's magazine criticized Gage for continuing to intimate that he has an association with the organization, and claimed that there were no architects at an Architects and Engineers for 9/11 Truth screening held in an AIA boardroom. RIBA released a statement saying the perception that it endorses events held in its buildings is "regrettable", and said it would review policy on "private hire" of its buildings. Anthony Summers and Robbyn Swan offer scathing criticism of many of the above theories in The Eleventh Day, their 2011 investigation of the attacks.

U.S. representative Peter T. King, chairmen of the House Homeland Security Committee, said 9/11 conspiracy theorists "trivialize" the "most tragic event to affect the United States" and that "[p]eople making these claims are disgraceful, and they should be ashamed of themselves".

The hosts of The Skeptics' Guide to the Universe (the "SGU") have spoken repeatedly about the "absurdity of 9/11 conspiracy theories". In addition to critiquing the theories using the same or similar arguments as the above, the "SGU" hosts say that, like most conspiracy theories, this one collapses under its own weight and contradicts itself. In order for the 9/11 conspiracy theories to be correct, the U.S. government would not only have to orchestrate the claimed false flag operation regarding the airplanes that crashed into the World Trade Center, but they would also have to orchestrate a superfluous controlled demolition and cover their tracks so flawlessly that it becomes indistinguishable to physicists from the "official story", yet the plan would have to be flawed enough so that "losers in their mothers' basement" will discover the conspiracy.

== In politics ==
Fidel Castro, the leader of Cuba, claimed in 2007 that a rocket actually hit the Pentagon and not American Airlines Flight 77. Castro asserted that no bodies were found at the site, despite the bodies of Flight 77's occupants being found at the site and identified by DNA.

Former Canadian Liberal Party leader Stéphane Dion forced a candidate from Winnipeg, Lesley Hughes, to terminate her campaign after earlier writings from Hughes surfaced in which Hughes wrote that U.S., German, Russian and Israeli intelligence officials knew about the 9/11 attacks in advance. Peter Kent, Deputy Editor of Global Television Network News and a Conservative Party candidate in the 2008 Canadian election, had earlier called for Hughes's resignation, saying that the 9/11 Truth movement is "one of Canada's most notorious hatemongering fringe movements" composed of "conspiracy theorists who are notorious for holding anti-Semitic views." On June 16, 2009, Hughes sued Kent, the Canadian Jewish Congress, the B'nai B'rith of Canada and four senior members of the two organizations, alleging the antisemitic allegations were untrue and defamatory and ruined her career. Later, another Conservative Party candidate called for the leader of the New Democratic Party to fire a candidate for her pro-9/11 truth views. Zijad Delic, head of the Canadian Islamic Congress, Canada's largest Muslim advocacy organization, is trying to remove 9/11 conspiracy theorists from its board, in an effort to what he describes as purifying within and totally canadianize the organization.

In 2008, calls for the resignation of Richard Falk, the special rapporteur on human rights in the Palestinian territories for the United Nations, were partially based on his support of investigating the validity of 9/11 conspiracy theories. In 2011, Falk praised a book by David Ray Griffin. Falk was condemned for his remarks by United Nations Secretary General Ban Ki-moon and United States ambassador to the United Nations Susan Rice.

In February 2009, Aymeric Chauprade, a professor of geopolitics at CID military college in Paris, was fired by French Defence Minister Hervé Morin for writing a book entitled Chronicle of the Clash of Civilizations that espoused 9/11 conspiracy theories.

In September 2009, Van Jones, an adviser to US President Barack Obama, resigned after his signature on a 2004 petition calling for an investigation into whether government officials deliberately allowed the 9/11 attacks to occur and other controversial statements came to light drawing criticism. Van Jones said he was a victim of a smear campaign, adding that he does not currently, nor ever has agreed with that theory.

The 9/11 truth movement became an issue in the 2010 Texas Gubernatorial Republican primary when candidate Debra Medina replied when asked by Glenn Beck about US government involvement in the 9/11 attacks: "I think some very good questions have been raised in that regard, there are some very good arguments, and I think the American people have not seen all of the evidence there, so I have not taken a position on that." After being criticized for the remarks by opposing candidates, Medina said that she has never been a 9/11 truth movement member and believes the twin towers were attacked by Muslim terrorists.

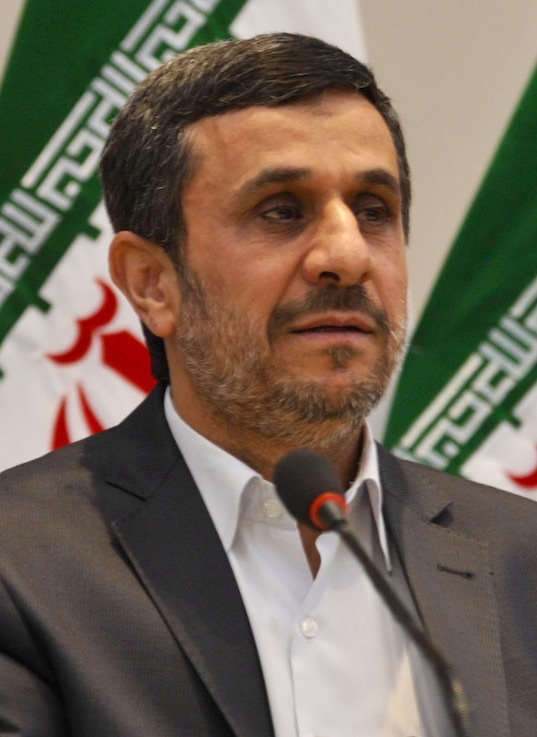
Iranian president Mahmoud Ahmadinejad made statements that were skeptical of al-Qaeda executing the 9/11 attacks.

On September 23, 2010, Iranian President Mahmoud Ahmadinejad in a speech to the United Nations said that "[t]he majority of the American people, as well as other nations and politicians, believe [...] some segments within the U.S. government orchestrated the attack to reverse the declining American economy and its grips on the Middle East in order to save the Zionist regime", and that "the majority of the American people as well most nations and politicians around the world agree with this view". The remarks prompted the United States delegation as well as others to walk out. U.S. President Barack Obama criticized Ahmadinejad's remarks before the United Nations General Assembly on the following day, saying that "[f]or him to make a statement like that was inexcusable" and called the remarks "offensive" and "hateful". Previously Ahmadinejad had described the 9/11 attacks as a "suspect event" and suggested that the Bush Administration was involved in 9/11. The Iranian president repeated his claims in 2011 with another appearance at the UN and was thereafter criticized in an article appearing in al-Qaeda's magazine, Inspire. The article claimed that Ahmadinejad was jealous of al-Qaeda because the stateless and under-fire Islamic terrorist organization did on 9/11 what Iran could not do.

In 2012, Egyptian President Mohamed Morsi has called for a scientific conference to look into the events of 9/11 and speculated that the attacks were an inside job. Although al-Qaeda occasionally brags about its "achievement," a Pew study reported in July 2011 that 75 percent of Egyptian citizens, for example, deny that Arabs carried out the attacks.

In a 2018 interview, future American Congresswoman Marjorie Taylor Greene expressed support for 9/11 conspiracy theories and stated that American Airlines Flight 77 did not hit the Pentagon during the September 11 attacks, referring to "the so-called plane that crashed into the Pentagon" and said that "it's odd there's never any evidence shown for a plane in the Pentagon", despite an abundance of evidence. On another occasion, at a conservative conference in 2018, Greene said 9/11 was part of a U.S. government plot. Following an August 2020 Media Matters report on her comments, Greene wrote on Twitter: "Some people claimed a missile hit the Pentagon. I now know that is not correct." She has also claimed that Democratic National Committee staff member Seth Rich was murdered by the MS-13 gang on Obama's behalf. According to Greene, Obama is secretly a Muslim, in which reality, he is a Christian.

== Legal cases ==
Army specialist April Gallop filed suit claiming that Vice President Dick Cheney, Secretary of Defense Donald Rumsfeld, and other Bush administration officials orchestrated the 9/11 attacks and that the Pentagon was hit by an attack ordered by Cheney. The suit was dismissed in 2010 by Judge Denny Chin, who said the claim was "the product of cynical delusion and fantasy". Her lawyers filed an appeal to the U.S. Court of Appeals which in April 2010 issued a show cause order why the lawyers and Gallop should not be sanctioned for filing a frivolous lawsuit. Her lawyers asked that the judges on the Court of Appeals recuse themselves because their emotions made them prejudge the case and abuse their power. On October 14, 2011, the judges sanctioned her lawyers $15,000 each for both the frivolous lawsuits and the accusations of prejudice. Gallop was not fined because of her unfamiliarity with the law.

== See also ==
- Opinion polls about 9/11 conspiracy theories
- 1941 Pearl Harbor advance-knowledge conspiracy theory
- 2004 Madrid train bombings controversies
- 2005 London July bombings conspiracy theories
