= Fiscal incidence =

Overall economic impact of both government taxation & expenditures on economic income

In public finance, a sub-discipline of economics, fiscal incidence is the combined overall economic impact of both government taxation and expenditures on the real economic income of individuals.

While taxation reduces the economic well-being of individuals, government expenditures raise their economic well-being. Fiscal incidence is the overall impact of government taxing and spending considered together.

== Theory ==
In theory, governments withdraw resources from society in the form of taxation, and contribute resources back into society in the form of expenditures. However, the burdens of taxation are not borne equally by individuals, and the benefits of government expenditures are not distributed equally throughout society. As a result, the distribution of tax burdens and government expenditure benefits is an important economic question to those concerned with the equity of the fiscal system. When the economic incidence of taxation is combined with the economic incidence of government expenditures, the result is a measure of the overall increase or decrease in welfare that individuals enjoy from the state's taxing and spending policies. This is referred to as fiscal incidence.

== Empirical literature ==
Early empirical studies of fiscal incidence date to the 1940s. Two early studies included Charles Stauffacher's (1941) study of the United States from 1930 to 1939, and Tibor Barna's (1945) study of the United Kingdom for 1937. Both studies identified substantial income redistribution with Stauffacher concluding that the lowest income group received 27 percent of federal spending between 1930 and 1939 while paying 5 percent of federal taxes. Barna's conceptual framework—first developed as a doctoral candidate at the London School of Economics under Nicholas Kaldor—was influential and today serves as the essential framework for fiscal incidence studies conducted by the British government.

Early results for the United States demonstrated that overall tax policy was mildly progressive — that is, when regressive state-local tax systems are combined with progressive federal taxes, the result is mildly progressive overall. On the spending side, early results illustrated that the distribution of expenditure benefits as a percentage of income was progressive as well, making the overall fiscal system more progressive than is apparent from the tax system alone. As a result, early studies found that overall fiscal incidence resulted in a net redistribution of income between income groups within the United States, from higher-income individuals to lower-income individuals. Here the term "progressive" refers to benefits accruing to lower-income individuals as opposed to those with higher incomes; "regressive" conversely refers to benefits accruing to higher-income individuals as opposed to those with lower incomes. The neutrality of these terms has been debated, but they are widely used in economic literature.

In the mid-1960s, two major studies established an approach that was often replicated in the following decades. W. Irwin Gillespie of the Brookings Institution (1965) and George A. Bishop of the Tax Foundation (1967) published extensive studies of U.S. taxes and spending for 1960 and 1961–65, respectively. Gillespie criticized previous literature for its limited scope and inadequate incidence analyses. Bishop departed from previous literature as well, basing tax and spending allocations on a single, consistent household survey—the Consumer Expenditure Survey from the Bureau of Labor Statistics, which was relatively new at the time—and developing a broad income concept rooted in the framework of the National Income and Product Accounts. Both studies found that the U.S. tax system was roughly proportional overall and mildly progressive over some ranges, while the distribution of expenditure benefits was sharply progressive, resulting a progressive overall distribution of fiscal incidence for 1961 and 1965.

The results of Bishop's 1967 study were replicated subsequently by several academics, such as Morgan Reynolds and Eugene Smolensky (1977), and were also utilized as the source data in a study in the political science literature, The Politics of Redistribution (1970) by Brian R. Fry and Richard F. Winters. Additionally, they prompted a 1970 critical response by H. Aaron and M. McGuire in Econometrica, "'Public Goods and Income Distribution".

In the 1990s a branch of fiscal incidence known as "benefit incidence analysis" grew in popularity. Largely pioneered by researchers at the World Bank, this approach focused narrowly on the distributional impact of education, health and transfer spending programs. Benefit incidence analyses typically provide detailed estimates of whether poverty-reducing programs—particularly in developing countries—reach targeted populations. Much of the literature is summarized in Thomas Selden and Michael Wasylenko (1992) and Dominique van de Walle (1996). Benefit incidence studies typically find spending on health, education and transfer payments to be strongly progressive, while finding mixed results on tax progressivity in different countries.

In some countries, official government agencies produce official studies of fiscal incidence to assist lawmakers in the design of tax and spending policies. For example, the Australian Bureau of Statistics periodically produces empirical estimates of the net fiscal incidence of Australia's overall government operations. The United Kingdom's Office for National Statistics also produces regular estimates of the impact of government taxes and spending on household income.

== See also ==
- Economic justice
- Public interest
- Tax incidence
