= Voltaire Network =

International non-profit advocacy organisation

The Voltaire Network (French: Réseau Voltaire, pronounced [ʁezo vɔltɛʁ]) is an international non-profit advocacy and alternative media organisation founded and led by French journalist Thierry Meyssan. It specializes in international relations and has become known for advocating conspiracy theories, notably relating to the 9/11 terrorist attacks and those in support of Russia, the Syrian (Bashar al-Assad) and Iranian governments.

The organisation was initially founded in 1994 as a left-wing think tank in support of free speech and secularism in France. It split in 2003 and was disbanded in 2007. It was re-founded as the International Voltaire Network (Réseau Voltaire International) in Lebanon by Thierry after he had become known for his 9/11 conspiracy theory book, 9/11: The Big Lie.

The Voltaire Network currently publishes a free website available in 17 languages (Arabic, English, French, German, Italian, Portuguese, Russian, Spanish, Turkish, and others) and two online databases and syndicates news from various agencies.

== Origins ==
The Voltaire Network was founded in the context of a campaign in favour of freedom of speech, which the founders thought was put into jeopardy by new laws enshrined in the French penal code. After the campaign the association lived on, specialising in the study of far-right movements and religions. It was vocal notably in preventing the French government from funding the religious part of the Pope's visit to France, and in initiating an investigation of the French Parliament regarding the French far-right militia group Department of Protection-Security. Since 1999, the Réseau Voltaire has dealt with international issues, including daily news about the bombings of Serbia by NATO.

== Internal dissensions ==
Several senior members of the Réseau have complained about a lack of control of the administration council over actions of the president and general secretary. They alleged that the president fostered an environment that suppressed criticism and failed to focus impartially on the board's general goals. Furthermore, they also cited what they believed to be an excessive critique of American foreign policy that was not balanced by reporting on the lack of political freedoms in the Middle East, where most network members tended to operate. The group also suggested that politically illiberal organizations or political figures believed to sponsor antisemitic views were treated uncritically. One example was Entretien avec le Hezbollah (Meeting with the Hezbollah) which presented the group, which is closely allied to Iran, as a "social group of Muslim inspiration, comparable to the Liberation theology in South America". Chairman Messyan was said to have visited Tehran to discuss his alternative theories positing that the United States conducted the 9/11 attacks as a false flag operation to justify intervention in Muslim affairs.

Three members of the administration council (Michel Sitbon, Gilles Alfonsi and Jean-Luc Guilhem) resigned in February 2005, over what they consider to be an adhesion to the theory of the so-called "Clash of Civilizations", although the Network's publications clearly oppose the theory as a neo-conservative strategy to control the world's last remaining oil reserves, and the instrumentalisation of the network. They object that "With the pretext of resisting American imperialism, lenience toward Chinese and Russian imperialisms and closeness with Islamists is symptomatic of a latent anti-Semitic drift among the direction." They also claim the existence of links with intelligence agencies, arguing that the Voltaire Network had been constructed against such organizations. However, they also underline that the new stance of the direction shouldn't cause the previous work of the network to be forgotten. Founding member Michel Sitbon cited the arrival of controversial personalities like Claude Karnoouh (who was never actually an administrator) and Bruno Drweski, while the Réseau, in a 2005 declaration, said that "administrators favourable to a French petty political conception of the association have been put in minority. They resigned either before or during the general assembly".
