= Opinion polls about 9/11 conspiracy theories =

Surveys of theories on terror attacks

Who do you think was behind the 9/11 attacks? (World Average, 2008)
1. Al-Qaeda (46.0%)
2. U.S. govt. (15.0%)
3. Israel (7.00%)
4. Other (7.00%)
5. Don't Know (25.0%)

Since the September 11 attacks, doubts have been raised about the mainstream account of events. There have been a number of 9/11 conspiracy theories with some suggesting that Israel was involved in the attacks and that members of the U.S. government may have deliberately covered-up and falsified events, in order to hide negligence, complicity, or even having been the perpetrator of the attacks.

A number of 9/11 opinion polls have been carried out to assess the prevalence of various opinions and views about questions related to the attacks, both in the United States and in other countries.

The size, form and quality of polls naturally vary considerably, as does the range and specificity of questions asked. They range from large, formal polls such as those conducted by Zogby International, to smaller, informal polls of limited scope, such as internet polls. The questions here relate specifically to doubts about the mainstream account, and in all cases were part of a group of questions dealing with wider issues, usually of a political nature.

== World opinion polls ==
A poll taken by WorldPublicOpinion.org, a collaborative project of research centers in various countries managed by the Program on International Policy Attitudes at the University of Maryland, College Park, polled 16,063 people in 17 nations outside of the United States during the summer of 2008. They found that majorities in only 9 of the 17 countries believe al-Qaeda carried out the attacks.

45 percent of those surveyed said al-Qaeda was responsible, 15 percent said the U.S. government, 7 percent said Israel and 7 percent said some other perpetrator. One in four people said they did not know who was behind the attacks.

The summary of the poll noted that "Though people with greater education generally have greater exposure to news, those with greater education are only slightly more likely to attribute 9/11 to al Qaeda." Steven Kull, director of WorldPublicOpinion.org, commented "It does not appear that these beliefs can simply be attributed to a lack of exposure to information." Of those who said the United States was the perpetrator, Kull says many believe it was an attempt to justify an impending U.S. invasion of Iraq.

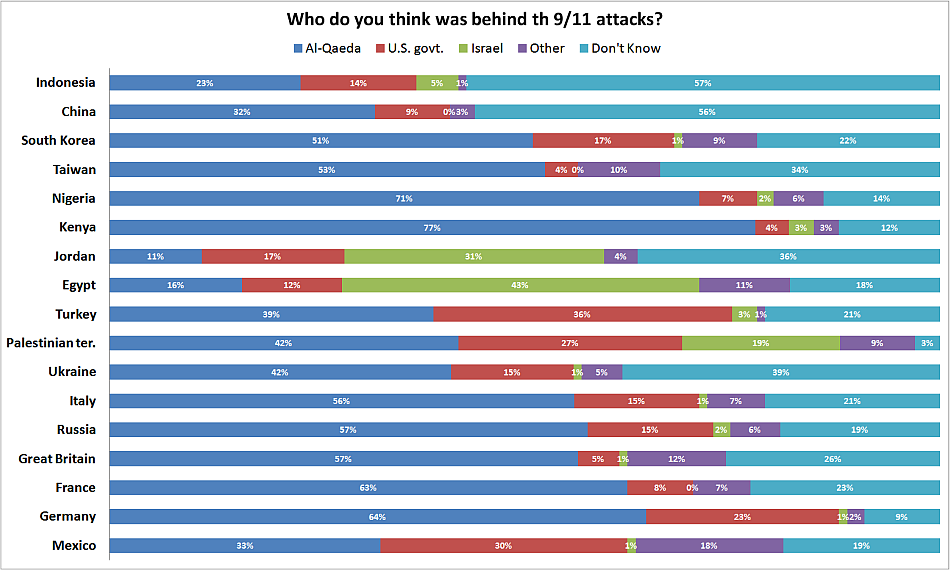

== National opinion polls ==
=== United States ===
==== Zogby International ====
The polls that have received the most widespread media attention are those conducted by Zogby International. The Zogby polls have been sponsored by organizations within the 9/11 Truth Movement including 911truth.org.

The first one was conducted in late August 2004 on 808 randomly selected residents of New York State. It found that 49 percent of New York City residents and 41 percent of New York state citizens believe individuals within the U.S. government "knew in advance that attacks were planned on or around September 11, 2001, and that they consciously failed to act." The margin of error for this poll was 3.5 percent.

The second major Zogby poll on 9/11 was conducted in May 2006. It was a telephone interview of 1,200 randomly selected adults from across the United States, consisting of 81 questions, with a 2.9 percent margin of error. Some of the questions asked include the following:

"Some people believe that the US government and its 9/11 Commission concealed or refused to investigate critical evidence that contradicts their official explanation of the September 11th attacks, saying there has been a cover-up. Others say that the 9/11 Commission was a bi-partisan group of honest and well-respected people and that there is no reason they would want to cover-up anything. Who are you more likely to agree with?"

- Responses: 48% No Cover-up / 42% Cover-up / 10% Not sure

"World Trade Center Building 7 is the 47-story skyscraper that was not hit by any planes during the September 11th attacks, but still totally collapsed later the same day. This collapse was not investigated by the 9/11 Commission. Are you aware of this skyscraper's collapse, and if so do you believe that the Commission should have also investigated it? Or do you believe that the Commission was right to only investigate the collapse of the buildings which were directly hit by airplanes?"

- Responses: 43% Not Aware / 38% Aware - should have investigated it / 14% Aware - right not to investigate it / 5% Not Sure

"Some people say that so many unanswered questions about 9/11 remain that Congress or an International Tribunal should re-investigate the attacks, including whether any US government officials consciously allowed or helped facilitate their success. Other people say the 9/11 attacks were thoroughly investigated and that any speculation about US government involvement is nonsense. Who are you more likely to agree with?"

- Responses: 47% Attacks were thoroughly investigated / 45% Reinvestigate the attacks / 8% Not Sure

The third major Zogby poll regarding 9/11 was conducted in August 2007. It was a telephone interview with a target of 1,000 interviews with randomly selected adults from across the United States, consisting of 71 questions, with a 3.1 percent margin of error.

The results of the 2007 August poll indicate that 51 percent of Americans want the United States Congress to probe President George W. Bush and Vice President Dick Cheney regarding the 9/11 attacks and over 30 percent of those polled seek immediate impeachment. While only 32 percent seek immediate impeachment of Bush and/or Cheney based on their personal knowledge, many citizens appear eager for clear exposure of the facts.

In addition, the poll also found that two-thirds (67 percent) of Americans say the 9/11 Commission should have investigated the collapse of World Trade Center Building 7. Only 4.8 percent of the respondents agreed that members of the U.S. government "actively planned or assisted some aspects of the attack."

==== Newsweek magazine polls ====
The Newsweek magazine poll "What America Knows," conducted by Princeton Survey Research Associates International, regularly asks American citizens a wide range of questions relating to world events both past and present, and a number of more trivial questions of general knowledge. On five occasions the following question has been asked:

"Do you think Saddam Hussein's regime in Iraq was directly involved in planning, financing, or carrying out the terrorist attacks of September 11th, 2001?"

- September 2003 responses: 47% Yes, 37% No, 16% not sure.
- January 2004 responses: 49% Yes, 39% No, 12% not sure.
- September 2004 responses: 42% Yes, 44% No, 14% not sure.
- October 2004 responses: 36% Yes, 51% No, 13% not sure.
- June 2007 responses: 41% Yes, 50% No, 9% not sure.

==== The New York Times / CBS News polls ====
The first 9/11 poll carried out by The New York Times and CBS News was conducted in May 2002. The same 9/11-related question was asked again in April 2004 and October 2006. The 2002 and 2006 polls were apparently published for the first time not by the NYT or CBS, but by polling researcher Angus Reid Public Opinion. The 2004 NYT/CBS poll is available at nytimes.com (Question 77).

The 2004 poll was conducted by telephone with 1,042 adults nationwide in the United States, with a 3 percent margin of error. The 2006 poll was conducted by telephone on 983 randomly selected citizens of the United States, with a 4 percent margin of error. One of the questions was the following:

"When it comes to what they knew prior to September 11th, 2001, about possible terrorist attacks against the United States, do you think members of the Bush Administration are telling the truth, are mostly telling the truth but hiding something, or are they mostly lying?"

- May 2002 responses: 21% said "telling the truth", 65% said they are "mostly telling the truth but hiding something", 8% said they are "mostly lying", 6% not sure.
- 3/30–4/1/04 CBS 24% said "telling the truth", 58% said they are "mostly telling the truth but hiding something", 14% said they are "mostly lying", 4% not sure.
- 4/8/04 CBS 21% said "telling the truth", 66% said they are "mostly telling the truth but hiding something", 10% said they are "mostly lying", 4% not sure.
- 4/23–27/04 24% said "telling the truth", 56% said they are "mostly telling the truth but hiding something", 16% said they are "mostly lying", 4% not sure.
- Oct 2006 responses: 16% said "telling the truth", 53% said they are "mostly telling the truth but hiding something", 28% said they are "mostly lying", 3% not sure.

CBS News and The New York Times have conducted a number of polls on the Iraq War that have included the question:

"Was Saddam personally involved in 9/11?"

- April 2003 responses: 53% said Yes, 38% said No.
- October 2005 responses: 33% said Yes, 55% said No.
- September 2006 responses: 31% said Yes, 57% said No.
- September 2007 responses: 33% said Yes, 58% said No.

==== Scripps Howard polls ====
A poll from July 2006, sponsored by Scripps Howard and conducted by Ohio University, surveyed 1,010 randomly selected citizens of the United States, with a margin of error of 4 percent. The survey found that 36 percent thought it somewhat or very likely that U.S. officials either participated in the attacks or took no action to stop them because they wanted the United States to go to war in the Middle East. It made some statements relating to some of the 9/11 conspiracy theories and asked respondents to say whether they thought that the statements were likely to be true.

Federal officials either assisted in the 9/11 attacks or took no action to prevent them because they wanted the United States to go to war in the Middle East.
- 59% "not likely"
- 20% "somewhat likely"
- 16% "very likely"

The collapse of the twin towers in New York was aided by explosives secretly planted in the two buildings.
- 77% "unlikely"
- 10% "somewhat likely"
- 6% "very likely"

The Pentagon was struck by a military cruise missile in 2001 rather than by an airliner captured by terrorists.
- 80% "not likely"
- 6% "somewhat likely"
- 6% "very likely"

In November 2007, Scripps Howard surveyed 811 Americans about their beliefs in several conspiracy theories and asked this question:

How about that some people in the federal government had specific warnings of the 9/11 attacks in New York and Washington, but chose to ignore those warnings. Is this very likely, somewhat likely or unlikely?
- 32% "Very Likely"
- 30% "Somewhat Likely"
- 30% "Unlikely"
- 8% "Don't Know/Other"

==== Other United States polls ====
Rasmussen Reports published the results of their poll May 4, 2007. According to their press release, "Overall, 22% of all voters believe the President knew about the attacks in advance. A slightly larger number, 29%, believe the CIA knew about the attacks in advance. White Americans are less likely than others to believe that either the President or the CIA knew about the attacks in advance. Young Americans are more likely than their elders to believe the President or the CIA knew about the attacks in advance.", "Thirty-five percent (35%) of Democrats believe he did know, 39% say he did not know, and 26% are not sure." and "Republicans reject that view and, by a 7-to-1 margin, say the President did not know in advance about the attacks. Among those not affiliated with either major party, 18% believe the President knew and 57% take the opposite view."

A poll reported in The Washington Post in September 2003 found that nearly 70 percent of respondents believed Saddam Hussein was probably personally involved in the attacks.

In May 2007, the New York Post published results of a Pew Research Center poll of more than 1,000 American Muslims. It found that 40 percent agreed that "Arabs carried out the 9/11 attacks," while 28 percent disagreed. Of the 28 percent that disagreed, a quarter (7 percent) believe that the U.S. government is responsible.

In September 2009, a National Obama Approval Poll, by Public Policy Polling, found that 27 percent of respondents who identified themselves as Liberals, and 10 percent as Conservatives, responded "yes" to the question, "Do you think President Bush intentionally allowed the 9/11 attacks to take place because he wanted the United States to go to war in the Middle East?"

A March 2010 poll conducted by the Angus Reid Public Opinion organization found that 15 percent of respondents found theories that the World Trade Center was brought down by a controlled demolition to be credible. Anywhere between 6 percent and 15 percent of respondents found credibility in claims that United Airlines Flight 93 was shot down, that no airplanes hit the Pentagon or the World Trade Center.

=== Canada ===
In September 2006, an Ipsos-Reid poll found that 22 percent of Canadians believe "the attacks on the United States on September 11, 2001, had nothing to do with Osama bin Laden and were actually a plot by influential Americans."

A September 2008 Angus Reid poll showed that 39 percent of respondents either disagree or are unsure that al-Qaeda carried out the attacks. About a third of those surveyed believed the U.S. government allowed the attacks to happen and 16 percent believe the U.S. government made the attacks happen.

=== Mexico ===
The WorldPublicOpinion.org opinion poll conducted during the summer of 2008 found that 33 percent of respondents in Mexico believe al-Qaeda were responsible. 30 percent said the U.S. government were responsible, 1 percent said Israel and 18 percent named another country. 19 percent said they did not know.

=== Europe ===
==== France ====
The WorldPublicOpinion.org opinion poll conducted during the summer of 2008 found that 63 percent of respondents in France believe al-Qaeda were responsible. 8 percent said the U.S. government were responsible and 7 percent named another country. 23 percent said they did not know.

==== Germany ====
The WorldPublicOpinion.org opinion poll conducted during the summer of 2008 found that 64 percent of respondents in Germany believe al-Qaeda were responsible. 23 percent said the U.S. government were responsible, 1 percent said Israel and 2 percent named another country. 9 percent said they did not know.

A representative poll conducted in 2003 by the Forsa Institute for the German newspaper Die Zeit found that 31 percent of the Germans under 30 years of age believe that the U.S. government commissioned the attacks.

In its January 2011 issue, the German magazine Welt der Wunder published the results of a poll conducted by the Emnid Institute on 1,005 respondents. The poll indicated that almost 90 percent of the Germans are convinced that the government of the United States is not telling the whole truth about the September 11 attacks.

==== Italy ====
The WorldPublicOpinion.org opinion poll conducted during the summer of 2008 found that 56 percent of respondents in Italy believe al-Qaeda were responsible. 15 percent said the U.S. government were responsible, 1 percent said Israel and 7 percent named another country. 21 percent said they did not know.

==== Russia ====
The WorldPublicOpinion.org opinion poll conducted during the summer of 2008 found that 57 percent of respondents in Russia believe al-Qaeda were responsible. 15 percent said the U.S. government were responsible, 2 percent said Israel and 6 percent named another country. 19 percent said they did not know.

==== Sweden ====
According to a poll conducted in September 2009 by Novus Opinion on behalf of the television channel TV4, 70 percent of the Swedes believe al-Qaeda was responsible for the attack, while 7 percent said they didn't believe it. Among young people (18–29) the numbers were 58 percent and 15 percent. Asked if they believe the theory represented in the film Loose Change that the U.S. government led by President George W. Bush was involved in the attacks, 64 percent of the public said no versus 8 percent yes, while the numbers for young adults were 51 percent versus 18 percent.

One thousand adults were polled, but in order to get a large number of people under 30 years, additional interviews were made. The total number of young people were 758.

==== Turkey ====
The WorldPublicOpinion.org opinion poll conducted during the summer of 2008 found that 39 percent of respondents in Turkey believe al-Qaeda were responsible. 36 percent said the U.S. government were responsible, 3 percent said Israel and 1 percent named another country. 21 percent said they did not know.

==== Ukraine ====
The WorldPublicOpinion.org opinion poll conducted during the summer of 2008 found that 42 percent of respondents in Ukraine believe al-Qaeda were responsible. 15 percent said the U.S. government were responsible, 1 percent said Israel and 5 percent named another country. 39 percent said they did not know.

==== United Kingdom ====
The WorldPublicOpinion.org opinion poll conducted during the summer of 2008 found that 57 percent of respondents in the United Kingdom believe al-Qaeda were responsible. 5 percent said the U.S. government were responsible, 1 percent said Israel and 12 percent named another country. 26 percent said they did not know.

A 2011 poll carried out by GfK NOP for the BBC found that 14 percent of Britons and 15 percent of Americans questioned believe the U.S. government was responsible for the 9/11 attacks. 1 in 4 of the 16- to 24-year-olds questioned held this belief.

=== Asia ===
==== Azerbaijan ====
A WorldPublicOpinion.org poll conducted in between July and September 2008 found that 69 percent of respondents in Azerbaijan believe al-Qaeda were responsible. 5 percent said the U.S. government were responsible, 6 percent said Israel and 7 percent named another country. 13 percent said they did not know.

==== People's Republic of China ====
The WorldPublicOpinion.org opinion poll conducted during the summer of 2008 found that 32 percent of respondents in China believe al-Qaeda were responsible. 9 percent said the U.S. government were responsible and 3 percent named another country. 56 percent said they did not know.

==== Taiwan ====
The WorldPublicOpinion.org opinion poll conducted during the summer of 2008 found that 53 percent of respondents in Taiwan believe al-Qaeda were responsible. 4 percent said the U.S. government were responsible and 10 percent named another country. 34 percent said they did not know.

==== India ====
A poll conducted by CNN-IBN in August 2007 found that 2 out of 5 of those polled in India believe that al-Qaeda is responsible for the 9/11 attacks.

==== Indonesia ====
A WorldPublicOpinion.org poll conducted in January 2007 found that 26 percent of respondents in Indonesia believe al-Qaeda were responsible. 17 percent said the U.S. government were responsible, 3 percent said Israel and 12 percent named another country. 43 percent said they did not know.

A WorldPublicOpinion.org poll conducted between July and September 2008 found that 30 percent of respondents in Indonesia believe al-Qaeda were responsible. 11 percent said the U.S. government were responsible, 3 percent said Israel and 3 percent named another country. 54 percent said they did not know.

The WorldPublicOpinion.org opinion poll conducted during the summer of 2008 found that 23 percent of respondents in Indonesia believe al-Qaeda were responsible. 14 percent said the U.S. government were responsible, 5 percent said Israel and 1 percent named another country. 57 percent said they did not know.

==== Pakistan ====
A WorldPublicOpinion.org poll conducted in February 2007 found that 2 percent of respondents in Pakistan believe al-Qaeda were responsible. 27 percent said the U.S. government were responsible, 7 percent said Israel and 1 percent named another country. 63 percent said they did not know.

A WorldPublicOpinion.org poll conducted between July and September 2008 found that 4 percent of respondents in Pakistan believe al-Qaeda were responsible. 19 percent said the U.S. government were responsible and 4 percent said Israel. 72 percent said they did not know.

A poll conducted by CNN-IBN in August 2007 found that only 1 in 20 of those polled in Pakistan believe that al-Qaeda is responsible for the 9/11 attacks.

==== South Korea ====
The WorldPublicOpinion.org opinion poll conducted during the summer of 2008 found that 51 percent of respondents in South Korea believe al-Qaeda were responsible. 17 percent said the U.S. government were responsible, 1 percent said Israel and 9 percent named another country. 22 percent said they did not know.

=== Africa and the Middle East ===
==== Egypt ====
A WorldPublicOpinion.org opinion poll conducted in February 2007 found that 28 percent of respondents in Egypt believe al-Qaeda were responsible. 9 percent said the U.S. government were responsible, 29 percent said Israel and 5 percent named another country. 29 percent said they did not know.

A WorldPublicOpinion.org poll conducted between July and September 2008 found that 23 percent of respondents in Egypt believe al-Qaeda were responsible. 13 percent said the U.S. government were responsible, 17 percent said Israel and 1 percent named another country. 46 percent said they did not know.

The WorldPublicOpinion.org opinion poll conducted during the summer of 2008 found that 16 percent of respondents in Egypt believe al-Qaeda were responsible. 12 percent said the U.S. government were responsible, 43 percent said Israel and 11 percent named another country. 18 percent said they did not know.

==== Jordan ====
A WorldPublicOpinion.org poll conducted between July and September 2008 found that 11 percent of respondents in Jordan believe al-Qaeda were responsible. 17 percent said the U.S. government were responsible, 31 percent said Israel and 4 percent named another country. 36 percent said they did not know.

==== Kenya ====
The WorldPublicOpinion.org opinion poll conducted during the summer of 2008 found that 77 percent of respondents in Kenya believe al-Qaeda were responsible. 4 percent said the U.S. government were responsible, 3 percent said Israel and 3 percent named another country. 12 percent said they did not know.

==== Morocco ====
A WorldPublicOpinion.org poll conducted in December 2006 found that 35 percent of respondents in Morocco believe al-Qaeda were responsible. 16 percent said the U.S. government were responsible, 15 percent said Israel and 7 percent named another country. 28 percent said they did not know.

==== Nigeria ====
The WorldPublicOpinion.org opinion poll conducted during the summer of 2008 found that 71 percent of respondents in Nigeria believe al-Qaeda were responsible. 7 percent said the U.S. government were responsible, 2 percent said Israel and 6 percent named another country. 14 percent said they did not know.

A WorldPublicOpinion.org poll conducted in Nigeria between July and September 2008 that included only Muslim interviewees found that 64 percent of the respondents believed al-Qaeda were responsible. 9 percent said the U.S. government were responsible, 2 percent said Israel, and 7 percent named another country. 19 percent said they did not know.

==== Palestinian territories ====
A WorldPublicOpinion.org poll conducted between July and September 2008 found that 42 percent of respondents in the Palestinian territories believe al-Qaeda were responsible. 27 percent said the U.S. government were responsible, 19 percent said Israel and 9 percent named another country. 3 percent said they did not know.

==== Summary of opinion polls ====
Results of Aggregated Polls Views of who is responsible for the 9/11 attacks
| Country polled | US Government | Al-Qaeda | Israel | Other | Don't Know |
|---|---|---|---|---|---|
| Mexico | 30% | 33% | 1% | 18% | 19% |
| France | 8% | 63% | - | 7% | 23% |
| Germany | 23% | 64% | 1% | 2% | 9% |
| Italy | 15% | 56% | 2% | 6% | 21% |
| Russia | 15% | 57% | 2% | 6% | 19% |
| Turkey | 36% | 39% | 3% | 1% | 21% |
| Ukraine | 15% | 42% | 1% | 5% | 39% |
| United Kingdom | 5% | 57% | 1% | 12% | 26% |
| Azerbaijan | 5% | 69% | 6% | 7% | 13% |
| China | 5% | 69% | 6% | 7% | 13% |
| Taiwan | 4% | 53% | - | 10% | 34% |
| Indonesia | 17% | 26% | 3% | 12% | 43% |
| Pakistan | 27% | 2% | 7% | 1% | 63% |
| South Korea | 17% | 51% | 1% | 9% | 22% |
| Egypt | 9% | 28% | 29% | 5% | 29% |
| Jordan | 17% | 11% | 31% | 4% | 36% |
| Kenya | 4% | 77% | 3% | 3% | 12% |
| Morocco | 16% | 35% | 15% | 7% | 28% |
| Nigeria | 7% | 71% | 2% | 6% | 14% |
| Palestine | 27% | 42% | 19% | 9% | 3% |

== See also ==
- September 11 attacks
- 9/11 Truth movement
- 9/11 conspiracy theories
- Saddam Hussein and al-Qaeda link allegations
- Zogby International
