= Jim Hoffman =

American conspiracy theorist

Jim Hoffman is a conspiracy theorist from Oakland, California, who created several web sites about the September 11, 2001 attacks that analyze and suggest alternative accounts for the events of that day. His primary website, 9-11 Research, serves as an archive of documentation and alternative analyses about the attacks. Hoffman has also written numerous technical essays which focus on the World Trade Center controlled demolition hypothesis.

In 2006, the Editor of Popular Mechanics, James B. Meigs, described Hoffman as a "leading conspiracy theorist."

== Background ==
Hoffman co-published a paper on "Computer graphics tools for the study of minimal surfaces".

== Causes ==
=== Justice For Woody ===
Hoffman was part of a citizens group that protested the killing by police of Robert "Woody" Woodward, in December 2001, after Woodward entered a church in Brattleboro, Vermont, seeking asylum from the CIA. Hoffman created a website detailing the incident.

=== September 11, 2001 attacks ===
Since early 2003, Hoffman has been writing about the collapse of the World Trade Center (WTC) and other aspects of the September 11, 2001 attacks. His work has examined the collapse of the smaller 7 World Trade Center, and he is critical of the official explanation of that collapse. Hoffman has also written a critique of the official National Institute of Standards and Technology (NIST) report on the building collapses, a critique of the 2006 NIST FAQ, and critiques of articles about the 9/11 conspiracy theories by the popular-science magazines Scientific American and Popular Mechanics.

== See also ==
- 9/11 Truth Movement
- 9/11 conspiracy theories
- World Trade Center controlled demolition conspiracy theories

== Publications ==
- Callahan, M. J.; Hoffman, D.; Hoffman, J. T. (1988). "Computer graphics tools for the study of minimal surfaces". Communications of the ACM. 31 (6): 648–661. doi:10.1145/62959.62961. S2CID 1852626.
- "Algorithms for the simulation of two-dimensional projections from structures determined by dividing surfaces". Journal of Colloid and Interface Science. 148 (2): 398–414. 1992. doi:10.1016/0021-9797(92)90179-P.
- Wohlgemuth, Meinhard; Yufa, Nataliya; Hoffman, James; Thomas, Edwin L. (October 2001). "Triply Periodic Bicontinuous Cubic Microdomain Morphologies by Symmetries". Macromolecules. 34 (17): 6083–6089. Bibcode:2001MaMol..34.6083W. doi:10.1021/ma0019499.
- Hoffman, Jim and Paul, Don. "Waking up from our Nightmare: The 9/11 Crimes in New York City" ISBN 0-943096-10-3
