= Thierry Meyssan =

French journalist and political activist (born 1957)

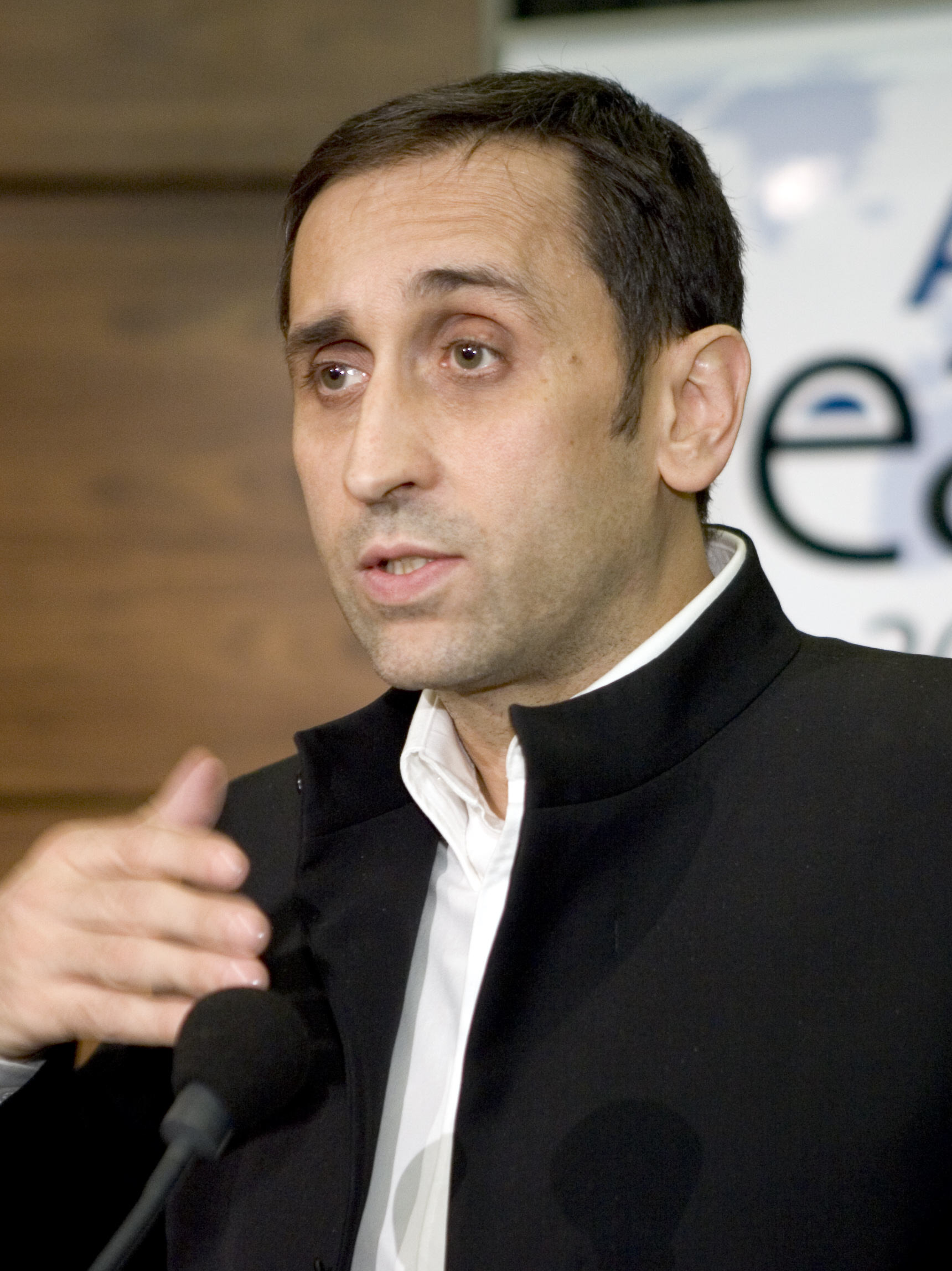
- Meyssan at the Axis for Peace conference, 2005
- Born: 1957 (age 68–69); Talence, Gironde, France
- Occupation: Journalist

Thierry Meyssan (French: [tjɛʁi mɛsɑ̃]) is a French conspiracy theorist, journalist, and left-wing political activist.

He is the author of investigations into the extreme right-wing, particularly France's National Front militias, as well as into the Catholic church.

Meyssan's book 9/11: The Big Lie (L'Effroyable imposture) challenges the official account of events of the September 11 terrorist attacks.

== Career ==
Meyssan is president of the Voltaire Network, which had been a respected independent think tank prior to the publication of 9/11: The Big Lie. His reputation helped raise his conspiracy theory to prominence.

Meyssan has been noted as using cross-citations of other conspiracy theorists' works in order to lend the appearance of credibility to his ideas. Regarding the events of 9/11, Meyssan cited Webster Tarpley; Tarpley cited David Ray Griffin; and Griffin cited Meyssan.

== Publication of The Big Lie ==
In 2002, he published a book on the September 11 terrorist attacks, with the English translation titled 9/11: The Big Lie. Meyssan argued that the attacks were organized by a faction of the US military–industrial complex in order to impose a non-democratic regime in the United States and to extend US imperialism. It is one of "the first wave of book-length conspiracy speculations" in France and Germany about 9/11.

A follow-up to his first book titled L'effroyable Imposture II (The Big Lie 2) accused Israel of carrying out the assassination of Rafic Hariri.

=== Response ===
French media quickly dismissed the contents of the book, and a Pentagon spokesperson also deprecated the book.

In 2005, the U.S. State Department declared Meyssan a persona non grata due to his active promotion of misinformation about the United States.

== Works ==
- La Protection des homosexuels dans le droit européen de Collectif, Projet Ornicar éd. (Paris), 1993, ISBN 2-910209-00-8.
- L'Intégration des transsexuels de Collectif, Projet Ornicar éd. (Paris), 1993, ISBN 2-910209-01-6.
- Charles Millon, le porte-glaive de Collectif, Golias (Lyon), 1999, ISBN 2-911453-39-5.
- L'Énigme Pasqua, Golias (Lyon), 2000, ISBN 2-911453-88-3.
- Terrorisme en soutane : Jean-Paul II contre l'IVG par le Réseau Voltaire pour la liberté d'expression, L'Esprit frappeur (Paris), 2000, ISBN 2-84405-141-3.
- 9/11 The Big Lie, Carnot Publishing (London), 2002, ISBN 1-59209-026-5.
- Pentagate, USA Books (New York), 2002, ISBN 1-59209-028-1.
- Os Senhores da Guerra, Frenesi (Lisboa), 2002, ISBN 972-8351-67-4.
- Foreword (with Jean Ziegler), Le Cartel Bush, Timéli (Genève), 2004, ISBN 2-940342-05-9.
- Politicamente Incorrecto, postface by Fidel Castro, Ciencias sociales (Cuba), 2004, ISBN 959-06-0640-7.
- Foreword (with José Saramago), El Neron del siglo XXI, Apostrofe (Madrid), 2004, ISBN 84-455-0258-1.
- L'Effroyable imposture 1 & Le Pentagate, Nouvelle édition annotée, Demi-lune (Paris), 2007, ISBN 978-2-9525571-6-0.
- Resistere alla menzogna in Zero, Perché la versione ufficiale sull'11/9 è un falso (avec Giulietto Chiesa), Piemme (Milan), 2007, ISBN 978-88-384-6838-4.
- L'Effroyable imposture 2. Manipulations et désinformation, Editions Alphée-Jean-Paul Bertrand (Paris), 2007, ISBN 978-2-7538-0239-1.
- Before Our Very Eyes, Fake Wars and Big Lies: From 9/11 to Donald Trump, Progressive Press, 2019, ISBN 978-1615770120
