= Morgan Reynolds =

American economist

Morgan O. Reynolds is the former director of the Criminal Justice Center at the National Center for Policy Analysis in Dallas, Texas, and a retired professor of economics at Texas A&M University. He served as chief economist for the United States Department of Labor in 2001–2002, during George W. Bush's first term. A member of Scholars for 9/11 Truth, Reynolds was one of the first prominent government officials to claim that 9/11 was an inside job.

Reynolds received his Ph.D. from the University of Wisconsin in 1971. His books include Public Expenditures, Taxes, and the Distribution of Income: The United States, 1950, 1961, 1970 (with Eugene Smolensky, 1977), Power and Privilege: Labor Unions in America (1984), Economics of Labor (1995), and Making America Poorer: The Cost of Labor Law (1987).
