= ArchitectureWeek =

International weekly magazine

- Available in: English
- Founded: 2000
- Headquarters: Eugene, Oregon, {{{location_country}}}
- Website: www.architectureweek.com

ArchitectureWeek was an international weekly magazine covering architecture and design. It is published online by Artifice, Inc. in Eugene, Oregon, United States.

ArchitectureWeek was founded in May 2000, and its first issue was published on May 17, 2000. Since 2024 the website is no longer reachable.

== Overview ==
The magazine's main audience is architects, design professionals, and architecture enthusiasts. It covers news, design, building technology, design tools, the environment and building culture.

The current Editor-in-Chief is Kevin Matthews. More than 100 authors have contributed to over 540 issues published to date.

ArchitectureWeek is interlinked with Archiplanet, a subject-specific wiki for all buildings and building makers.

Over the years, the editors of ArchitectureWeek have selected architecture from around the world and across history that now comprise the Great Buildings collection. Pages include photographic images and architectural drawings, integrated maps and timelines, 3D building models, commentaries, bibliographies, and web links, with Google Maps throughout.
