= Eugene Smolensky =

American economist

Eugene Smolensky was an economist and emeritus professor at the Goldman School of Public Policy, University of California, Berkeley, where he served as Dean from 1988 to 1997.

He was Vice President of the International Institute of Public Finance and vice-chair of the Board of Trustees of the Russell Sage Foundation. As an economist, Smolensky “studies welfare policy and the impact of economic and demographic changes on the distribution of income among various social groups.”. He was also a professor and chair of the Economics Department at the University of Wisconsin–Madison and an associate professor at the University of Chicago. He was also director of the Institute for Research on Poverty from July 1980 until July 1983.

== Education ==
Smolensky earned his doctorate in economics in 1961 from the University of Pennsylvania under Richard Easterlin. His thesis was entitled Some Factors Affecting the Location of Economic Activity and the Size Distribution of Income.
