= 9/11: The Big Lie =

2002 book by Thierry Meyssan

- Book cover of the English version
- Author: Thierry Meyssan
- Language: French
- Publisher: Carnot Press
- Publication date: 8 March 2002
- ISBN: 978-2912362445

L'effroyable Imposture (or "The Horrifying Fraud") is the original French title of a highly controversial and discredited 2002 book by French journalist and political activist Thierry Meyssan. Its English edition is entitled 9/11: The Big Lie.

The book argues that the attacks of September 11, 2001, were "false flag" operations directed by right-wingers in the U.S. government and the military-industrial complex who sought a casus belli for military action in Afghanistan and Iraq. A publishing sensation in France, the book has received severe criticism over its factuality in both the French and United States mainstream news media. The U.S. government has publicly denounced the book and considers it a significant international misinformation threat. The crux of the criticism emphasizes that the book contradicts much eyewitness and forensic evidence and so cannot be accepted as a factual account.

The book, reported to have sustained a number 1 bestseller position in France for six of seven weeks immediately after its launch, sold 164,100 copies in the first year, and a total of 300,000 up to date. It has since been translated into 28 languages (as of 2006)

== Synopsis ==
The book questions the U.S. government version of the events and raises a large number of questions on the details of the events which, according to many observers, marked the beginning of the 21st century and changed the geopolitical world order. It makes the following claims:

=== First part: "A Bloody Stage is Set" ===
The actions that provoked the collapse of the Twin Towers in lower Manhattan and damaged part of the Pentagon in Arlington County, Virginia, were not the result of attempts by foreign suicide pilots, but were rather an action organized by a group within the U.S. administration; an internal plot aimed at driving opinion and forcing the course of events.

=== Second part: "The Death of Democracy in America" ===
The war on Afghanistan was not a response to the September 11 events, since it was prepared long before in coordination with the British. President Bush found support in evangelical groups to launch a crusade against Islam, according to the strategy known as "Clash of Civilizations". The "war on terror" was a pretext to reduce individual liberties in the United States and later in allied countries in order to impose a military regime.

=== Third part: "The Empire Strikes Back" ===
Osama bin Laden was a C.I.A. fabrication and never stopped working for the U.S. Secret Service. The bin Laden and Bush families jointly manage their wealth by means of the Carlyle Group. The U.S. presidential administration was taken over by some industrial groups (weapons, oil, pharmaceuticals) whose interests would be defended by the government, to the detriment of others. The C.I.A. would develop a program of interference at all levels, which would include the resource of torture and political assassination.

== Response ==
The book was widely and heavily criticized by the French news media. The leading centre-left newspaper Libération wrote the book was: "the frightening confidence trick ... A tissue of wild and irresponsible allegations, entirely without foundation"; and the prominent French weekly news magazine, Le Nouvel Observateur commented the book's theory "eliminates reality". Both Libération and Le Monde launched special investigations to disprove Meyssan's theories. At the time, Le Monde also complained that inconsistencies in the public information made available about the terror attacks, as well as the lack of a comprehensive official account, were fueling the popularity of the book.

A few months after the launch of L'effroyable imposture, two French journalists, Guillaume Dasquié (former editor-in-chief of Intelligence Online) and Jean Guisnel, published their own book L'effroyable mensonge ("The Horrifying Lie"), which was a point-by-point rebuttal of Meyssan's work.

A spokesman for the U.S. Department of Defense has officially commented that the book's publication was "a slap in the face and real offense to the American people, particularly to the memory of victims of the attacks". The book is regarded as a significant international misinformation threat to national interests by the U.S. Department of State, which has issued an official rebuttal of its key claims.
