= The CIA and September 11 =

2003 book by Andreas von Bülow

- Author: Andreas von Bülow
- Original title: Die CIA und der 11. September
- Language: German
- Subject: September 11 attacks
- Publisher: Piper Verlag
- Publication date: 2003
- ISBN: 9783492045452

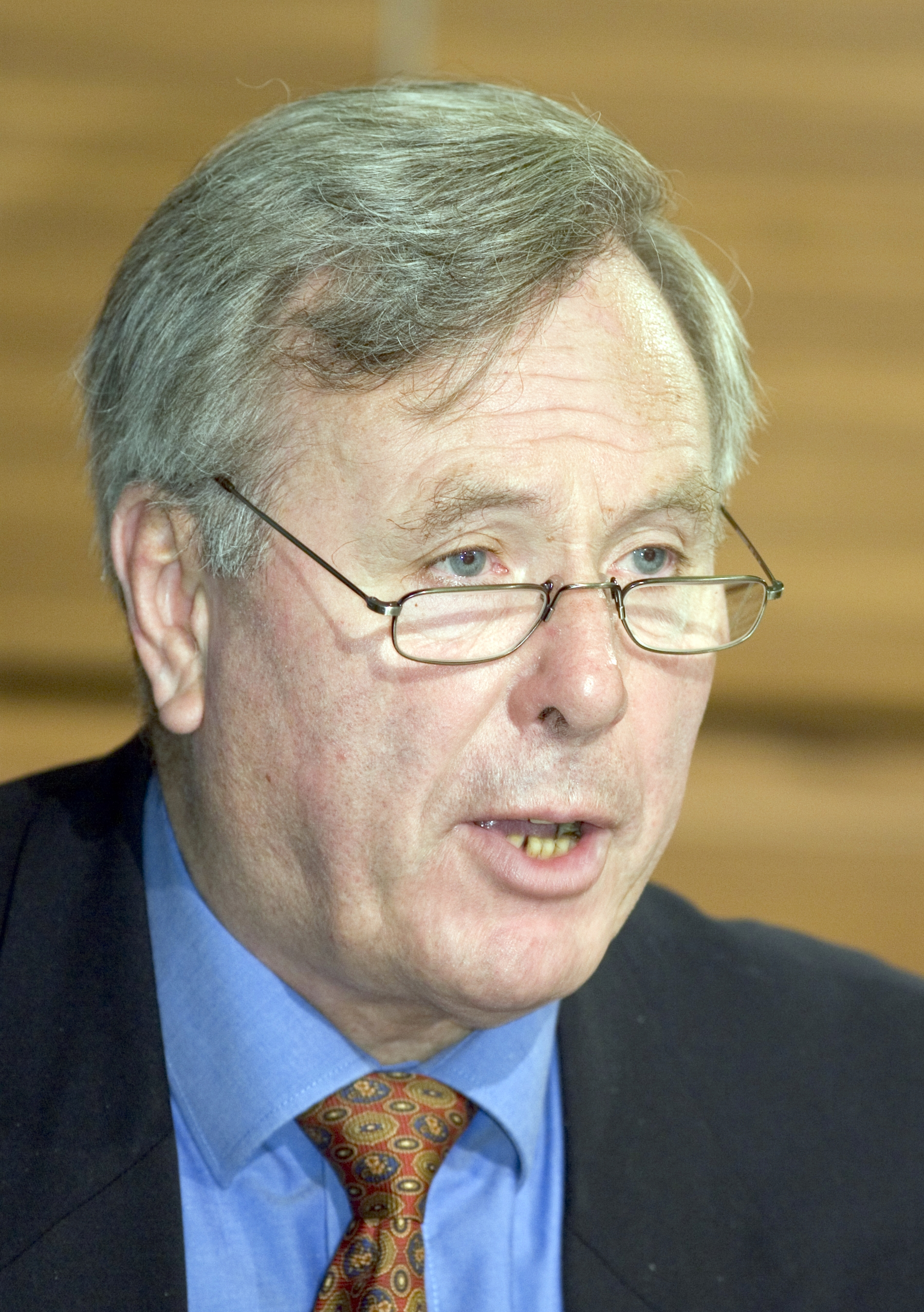
Andreas von Bülow in 2005

The CIA and September 11 (German: Die CIA und der 11. September) is a 2003 non-fiction book by Andreas von Bülow, a former state-secretary in the German Federal Ministry of Defence and a Social Democratic member of the Bundestag from 1969 to 1994. The book disputes al-Qaeda's responsibility for the September 11 attacks and suggests that it may have instead been a false flag operation arranged by the U.S. federal government and Israel. The book has enjoyed considerable commercial success in Germany, where it is published by Piper Verlag, and has sold over 100,000 copies. However, it has faced allegations ranging from absurdity and fostering anti-Americanism, to antisemitism, while the quality of its sourcing and the timing of its publication have given rise to debate within the German publishing industry. In subsequent media appearances, Bülow has defended his work, and strongly denied that its content is antisemitic.

== Synopsis ==
The book suggests that the September 11 attacks were self-inflicted: a covert operation aimed at influencing domestic opinion and to persuade Americans to support the invasions of Afghanistan and of Iraq. It is written in a speculative style, laden with terms such as "could", "might", "maybe" and "if", and does not directly accuse the Central Intelligence Agency of direct responsibility for the attacks. It does, however, attempt to demolish the "conventional" account of the 9/11 attacks, and while it does not build up a substantive account to replace it, it leaves insinuations and rumours to suggest possibilities. For instance, while it is argued that such well-organized attacks could only occur with "the support of the intelligence agencies", the exact details of that support are left unspecified. The book suggests that no plane crashed into The Pentagon and none in Pennsylvania on 9/11, and that the alleged mobile phone calls on United Airlines Flight 93 were not real.

It states that the theory of the Arab hijackers was created by the CIA, and that these Arabs may not even have been aware that the planes were going to crash. Seven of the alleged hijackers are claimed in the book to have been found alive and well after the attacks. The book explores the possibility that the various aircraft could have been remote-controlled. It cites observations in support of the theory that the collapse of the World Trade Center might have been due to explosives. Von Bülow does not believe that Osama bin Laden and al-Qaeda are responsible for the 9/11 attacks.

== Publication ==
The book caused a storm at the 2003 Frankfurt Book Fair, together with a number of other German books on the "real story" behind the 9/11 attacks, following the success of Thierry Meyssan's 9/11: The Big Lie in France. Other best-selling books included Mathias Bröckers's Conspiracies, Conspiracy Theories and the Secrets of September 11th and Gerhard Wisnewski's Operation 9/11 (ISBN 3-426-77671-5), but The CIA and September 11 became the best known. The 271 page book has had a vast print run in Germany, with more than 100,000 copies being sold, and became a number three best-seller on the Der Spiegel non-fiction chart.

Piper Verlag is considered a reputable publisher. The editor of Piper Verlag, Klaus Stadler, contended in an interview with Deutsche Welle that:

We told ourselves that we would take it seriously, but we do not feel obligated to independently check each and every detail ... And my own personal position is that Mr. von Bülow poses a number of very interesting and important questions. The answers to these questions should be weighed by responsible readers, who should take time to consider them. We don't want to patronize people.

However, Deutsche Welle found other industry observers who credited an increasingly competitive German publishing market with persuading companies to take on books they previously might not have accepted. A representative from the Börsenblatt bookstore also suggested that in the past, companies would at least have waited longer before releasing such a sensitive book.

The release coincided with widespread skepticism among the German public about the honesty and motivation of the George W. Bush administration, to the extent that a Forsa survey published in Die Zeit in July 2003 found that nineteen percent of Germans (rising to thirty one percent among under 30s) believed that elements within the United States government were behind the 9/11 attacks. This provided fertile ground for The CIA and September 11, which sold strongly: von Bülow eclipsed the sales of writers who clung to a "conventional" interpretation of the 9/11 attacks, such as the intelligence expert Oliver Schrom.

== Response ==
The work has been described as supporting or fostering anti-Americanism. However, in an interview with The Daily Telegraph, von Bülow denied that his book was contributing to anti-American sentiment in Germany: "I'm not in the least anti-American ... I'm just part of a growing momentum against Bush and his chess power-politics. I feel sorry for those who are being sucked in by his ideas."

The book has also been attacked for the quality of its journalism and research. The author admitted that much of the material came from the Internet and discharged the burden of proof by claiming that it was for the American government to refute the allegations rather than for him to prove them. This produced anger among authors using more conventional journalistic methods: "The line in the sand is when respectable media and publishers start serving up fiction as truth," was the response of Oliver Schrom (whose study of the 9/11 attacks pointed the finger at intelligence failures, rather than a more spectacular claim of CIA complicity).

The CIA and September 11 was one of the subjects of a cover story in Der Spiegel in September 2003, along with Gerhard Wisnewski's WDR documentary Aktenzeichen 11.9. ungelöst and the books Conspiracies, Conspiracy Theories and the Secrets of September 11th (Bröckers) and Operation 9/11 (Wisnewski). The article, entitled "Panoply of the Absurd", sharply criticizes von Bülow's reliance on Internet research, in particular that he had used archived but inaccurate stories that had been written in the confusion of the immediate aftermath of the attacks and then dropped.

An example of this is the assertion that at least six of the suspected hijackers named in the aftermath of the attacks turned up alive, the so-called "zombie hijackers" claim. Der Spiegel offers an explanation for this apparent mystery: BBC News used as a source the Arab News, an English-language Saudi newspaper, which in turn had compiled reports from Arabic newspapers, of people who obviously had nothing to do with the attacks but happened to share the same names with some of the suspected hijackers. No photographs of the suspected hijackers had been released at this point in time, and thus a few cases of mistaken identity occurred. In one instance, a man with the name of Said al-Ghamdi had given an interview to Asharq Al-Awsat newspaper in Tunis, outraged that he had been portrayed by CNN as one of the hijackers. CNN had broadcast his photograph after doing research on their own and finding a Saudi "Said al-Ghamdi" who had received flight training in the United States. CNN had found the wrong suspect, which only became clear once the FBI officially released the photographs of the suspected hijackers.

The Spiegel article accuses von Bülow of accepting without due scrutiny any fragment or urban legend that fits his suspicions of foul play, and describes him as a "dreamer". However, in his analysis of von Bülow's book and the response to it in Germany, Stefan Theil has contended that Der Spiegel is, itself, not unknown to publish speculative or conspiratorial theories, and suggests that the surprisingly strenuous article had deeper motivations than high feelings over journalistic quality. He speculates that the fact that Germans who claimed to believe that George W. Bush masterminded 9/11 were not actually demonstrating in the streets was a sign that they simply regarded the conspiracy theorist literature as "political entertainment". With American difficulties in Iraq intensifying, and the possibility of Europe becoming dragged in, politicians and journalists alike were being forced to turn away from the escapism the plots offered.

== Allegations of antisemitism ==
Der Spiegel followed up several claims in an interview with the author. One of the claims in the book is that only one Israeli citizen died in the WTC attack (this was reported in the New York Times on September 22, 2001, but the Israeli consulate later asserted that seven Israelis were among the dead in the WTC), and that "a number of indications" exist "that point to some sort of connection between the Israeli Mossad and the act and perpetrators of 9/11." However, when interviewed by the magazine about the claim that 4,000 Jewish employees did not attend work at the WTC on the day of the attacks, he avoided concrete statements ("They didn't know about it. They had an idea"), an approach the magazine described as "convoluted". It concludes that his allegations were little more than "whispers in the dark", fueled by conspiracy myths circulating on the Internet.

Mentions of the theory that Jews stayed away from the WTC on 9/11, and the idea of Mossad involvement in or foreknowledge of the attacks, has led to claims that the book feeds the "new antisemitism". A report by the American Jewish Committee accused the book, along with other so-called 9/11 conspiracy literature of 2003, of perpetuating myths and stereotyping Jews as criminal and conspiratorial. The Anti-Defamation League has found evidence of Bülow being cited by antisemitic publications and websites keen to link Mossad to the 9/11 attacks.

In a prominently placed TV interview with ARD, Andreas von Bülow said it was a "Medienmasche" (media scam) to accuse him of antisemitism. He denied that he ever said or believed anything about "Jews" being warned of the attacks (one of the urban legends). He said such claims were nonsense. He confirmed, however, that in his opinion a number of indications exist which point to some sort of connection between the Israeli Mossad and the act and perpetrators of 9/11.

== Editions ==
- Die CIA und der 11. September. Internationaler Terror und die Rolle der Geheimdienste. Piper Verlag GmbH, Munich 2003, ISBN 3-492-04545-6 and 2004, ISBN 3-492-24242-1

== See also ==
- Bin Laden Issue Station – the CIA's tracking unit, 1996–2005
- Hijackers in the September 11 attacks
- 9/11 Truth movement
- 9/11 conspiracy theories
