= Wir sind die Guten =

Non-fiction book by Mathias Bröckers and Paul Schreyer

Wir sind die Guten. Ansichten eines Putinverstehers oder wie uns die Medien manipulieren (We are the good guys. The views of a Putin apologist or how the media manipulate us) is a non-fiction bestseller by Mathias Bröckers and Paul Schreyer, which was published by Westend Verlag on 1 September 2014. It reached number 5 on the Spiegel bestseller list for non-fiction books, remained on the bestseller list for 20 weeks and went through ten editions in 2014. It has been translated into Russian and Czech. The main topics are the geostrategy and international power politics behind the Russian war in Ukraine, as well as a critical appraisal of German public media.

== Content ==
In their introduction, the authors refer to Karl Kraus' The Last Days of Mankind in their criticism of the media. The conclusion of the study is that the Ukraine conflict can only be resolved peacefully if Ukraine is ‘not built up as a nationalist-fascist bastion against an “evil empire” in the east’, but as a ‘non-aligned bridge state between Russia and the EU’.

The first chapter analyses the widespread opinions about Vladimir Putin's personality and the autocratic ‘deficient democracy’ and ‘homophobia’ within the Russian Federation. The authors portray Putin as a politician held in high esteem by the majority of Russians, who, above all by taming the ‘predatory capitalism’ of the Yeltsin era, has led Russia back to sustainable prosperity, internal and external security, order, sovereignty and national independence.

Behind the focus of Western media and politicians on the weaknesses of Putin's way of governing, which the authors themselves name, they see the aim of asserting economic and political interests on the geopolitical chessboard against Russia by manipulating public opinion, above all through slander and defamation, false dilemma, self-aggrandisement. The civil war in Ukraine is seen as a proxy war and an expression of a new Cold War.

The second chapter presents the history of Ukraine under the title ‘Empire of Conflicts’. The authors emphasise the ethnic, cultural and linguistic affinity between Russians and Ukrainians and their shared history. Today's Ukraine, on the other hand, is seen as polyethnic and multicultural, without a clear national identity. In characterising the Ukrainian language, the authors refer to the Kiev-born Russian writer Mikhail Bulgakov. In his Kiev novel The White Guard, he described Ukrainian merely as a variant and a ‘peasant language’. The pride of some Ukrainians in their "dialect" is depicted by Bulgakow as a regression into a ‘limited, narrow-minded nationalism’. The chapter also analyses the history of Ukraine during the Second World War, especially Bandera's activities, the history of Crimea and its ethno-cultural, economic, military and political significance for Russia.

Chapter 3, ‘World domination’, presents the new Great Game based on the geostrategic concepts of Halford Mackinder (Heartland), Karl Haushofer and Zbigniew Brzeziński. The authors identify those concepts of power politics in the attitude of the British diplomat Robert Cooper, insofar as he represents double standards and favours a "policy of the jungle" to assert national interests, without paying heed to Western values.

Chapter 4 (Oil, Gas and Security: Welcome to Pipelineistan) describes the interest in controlling oil and gas supplies via pipelines as the main motive for meddling in the affairs of Russia and Ukraine.

With regard to the annexation of Crimea, the authors follow Reinhard Merkel's arguments and also accuse the critics of double standards and exaggeration, as the annexation should not be seen as a case of ‘unprecedented aggression’.

Better than War: Colour Revolutions and Fake Democracy (Chapter 5) argues that colour revolutions had already been planned and carried out several times before the Maidan protests. The authors trace the concept back to Fred Emery, Howard Perlmutter and the Tavistock Institute. John Arquilla and David Ronfeldt (RAND Corporation) are said to have adapted their ideas to the digital modern age.

The authors argue that the ‘regime change’ of 2014 had had a 60-year history in Ukraine: in CIA activities (Chapter 6), such as Operation Aerodynamic, of which the authors consider Mykola Lebed to be a key figure and which was controlled by the Office of Policy Coordination within the CIA under the leadership of Frank Wisner. In their view, this was followed by the activities of the Prolog Research Corporation and the National Endowment for Democracy.

The "regime change" in Ukraine (cf. Euromaidan) was ‘ordered’ and, according to many indications, triggered by a special unit of Georgian snipers led by an American, some of whom fired on demonstrators and police forces from the Hotel Ukraina (Chapter 7). The authors rely on eyewitness reports, ARD research, statements by Georgians and their flight tickets. The public media did not follow up on some of the information they had researched themselves. The election of the new government was not carried out in an orderly and constitutional manner: the opposition was intimidated and excluded, the vote was held without the necessary 3/4 majority and the impeachment and election of the new President of Ukraine took place in violation of Articles 111 and 112 of the Ukrainian constitution.

With her statements against the EU and her appointment of Prime Minister Yatsenyuk, Victoria Nuland had made it clear that the interests of the USA were geared towards conflict with Russia against the interests of Europe (Chapter 8). The Project for the New American Century, co-founded by Nuland's husband Robert Kagan, had supported the global political role of the USA, which was followed by the Foreign Policy Initiative (FPI) as ‘old wine in new bottles’.

Chapter 9 presents the Atlantic Council as an ‘interface in the power game’.

Chapter 10 presents the president and billionaire Poroshenko as an oligarch and entrepreneur in the arms industry who was in contact with American institutions and George Soros' Renaissance Foundation at an early stage. German and international foundations had guided the new government according to the authors.

In chapter 11, networks and lobby groups are shown to be behind the media uniformity of German reporting on Ukraine, with Bröckers drawing on Uwe Krüger's analyses of opinion power. In chapter 12, journalistic mistakes, one-sidedness and linguistic manipulation are presented in detail, with reference to the analyses of the Propagandaschau and Volker Bräutigam's complaints to the German Broadcasting Board which monitors compliance with the statutory broadcasting mandate for German public media.

In the case of the downing of the MH17 plane (Chapter 13), after weighing up various hypotheses, the authors come to the conclusion that a real investigation is a long way off, ‘the instrumentalisation of the crime on the backs of the victims and their relatives continues’. Despite the technical possibilities, neither side has any interest in clearing up the crime. Chapter 14 on the use of Novichok against Sergei Skripal comes to a similar conclusion. According to the authors, the inconsistencies in the case make a false flag operation appear possible.

Full-spectrum dominance as a US state doctrine is explained on the basis of the Melian dialogue. The unipolar approach of US security strategies from the Wolfowitz Doctrine to the Bush Doctrine is contrasted with the multipolar Eurasianism concepts of Trubetzkoy and Dugin (Chapter 15).

Chapter 16 assesses America's striving for dominance and fear as a form of political paranoia, which Europe and especially Germany, with its economic and political affinity to Russia, should not allow to influence them any further.

In the centre of Europe, Germany therefore has a key role to play in developing an alternative to a new policy of strength that has no prospects - apart from the nuclear apocalypse of a third world war. (p. 225)

In Chapter 17, the authors see a ‘complex system of military, armaments, secret services and corporations’ behind Russiagate. Despite all the justified criticism that Trump attracts as a ‘narcissistic and unsympathetic chauvinist’, his opponents are not directed against his dubious character, but against his political views and intentions. ‘And as long as he does not renounce them, the concentrated power of the ‘Deep State’ will continue to target him and keep the bizarre ‘Russiagate’ circus in the headlines ad infinitum.’ (p. 245)

== Response to the first edition ==
In his review for SWR2 Kulturradio, Ulrich Teusch emphasised that it was a ‘necessary, overdue provocation’ that might help to open up and objectify the Ukraine debate in Germany. The authors offer a ‘sobering analysis’ of the events on the Maidan, dissect the ‘infiltration of the country by US interests’ and draw ‘unflattering portraits’ of the political players in Kiev, especially Yulia Tymoshenko and Petro Poroshenko.

In her review on 8 September 2014, Brigitte Baetz (Deutschlandfunk) said: ‘From the authors’ justifiable point of view, it is not about freedom and human rights but about power and military control; for years, the foreign policy of the United States has been determined by economic interests. This does not excuse Putin, for example, the treatment of homosexuals in Russia. However, criticising Russian conditions is unfair, insofar as this was very similar in the West not long ago and is tolerated by its ally Saudi Arabia. According to the authors, the West's complicity in the escalation in Ukraine is not dealt with enough, and Russia's perspective is also missing. Bröcker and Schreyer's criticism of the denunciatory use of the term ‘Putinversteher’ and the black-and-white painting as a warmongering dichotomy is justified. According to Schmid, the authors have taken up an important point here, which is not unjustifiably criticised by many citizens:

The flashy way in which newspapers as different as “BILD” and “Spiegel”, for example, take a stand against Russia in the same way and speak out in favour of war as a political tool.

Nevertheless, the well-written book suffers a little from the fact "that it simply turns the tables and makes the Americans the bad guys."

On 14 September 2014, Richard Zietz (Der Freitag) described the book as the right book at the right time. More and more citizens consider the ‘escalation course that the West is pursuing towards Russia to be irresponsible, damaging to European interests, politically and morally one-sided and, moreover, highly dangerous.’ The major leading media would follow the principle: ‘more of the same, more of the same.’ Bröckers and Schreyer provide an unsparing analysis of Western hubris and media co-responsibility for escalation. Even if their perspective does not cover all facets, the book offers essential food for thought for a debate that is often characterised by simplification, according to Zietz. The authors call for a return to dialogue-oriented politics (‘change through rapprochement’, Egon Bahr) - an alternative to the current logic of confrontation. Mathias Bröckers and Paul Schreyer question the Western narrative of the Ukraine crisis and offer a provocative critique of NATO, EU and US geopolitics. The book, published during the escalation between Russia and the West in 2014, questions the authors' perceived moral self-assurance of Western interventions and media coverage. In the reviewer's opinion, it positions itself as a rare critical voice in a book landscape dominated by pro-Western perspectives. The authors deconstructed the pejorative label of the ‘Putin-understander’ and argued that an understanding of Russian motives does not mean support for Putin.They contextualise his popularity in Russia by contrasting his stabilisation of the post-Yeltsin turmoil with the Western media caricature of him as an authoritarian strongman.This chapter criticises how nuanced analyses are ignored in favour of ideological simplification.Bröckers and Schreyer trace the historical divide in Ukraine - between the Russian-speaking East and the nationalist West - to show that national identity is a contested construct.They argue in favour of Ukraine as a ‘bridge state’, not as a pawn of the West or Russia, and criticise NATO's eastward expansion and EU pressure policy, which would have exacerbated internal conflicts in Ukraine.The book sheds light on the economic foundations of the conflict, including failed projects such as the South Stream pipeline. The authors describe Ukraine as the key in the struggle between Russian gas dominance and Western alternatives (e.g. fracking) and show how energy security shapes geopolitical alliances. By analogy with Syria and Libya, the authors criticise Western-backed ‘democracy promotion’ as covert regime change. They question the Maidan protests, point to unresolved violence (e.g. sniper attacks on both sides) and the role of Western NGOs in mobilising protests. The MH17 tragedy serves as an example of unresolved contradictions that are used for propaganda purposes. A harsh indictment of leading German media (Spiegel, Süddeutsche Zeitung, ARD/ZDF) accuses them of parroting transatlantic narratives and marginalising critical voices. The authors link this to think tanks and NGOs that align media reports with US strategies - deepening a divide between public scepticism and elite consensus.

On 11 October 2014, Inga Pylypchuk (Die Welt) placed the authors in the vicinity of Kremlin propaganda: the language betrays them when they call Pussy Riot ‘bawling punk chicks’ and describe the protests on the Maidan as a ‘coup sponsored by the West’. The view that Russia Today is labeled as an ‘alternative news source’ seems also revealing to the reviewer. The authors are also in line with the Russian government in their theses on Ukraine's national identity and the annexation of Crimea in 2014.

Stefan Niggemeier commented in the FAZ on 2 November 2014 that the book was a counterpart to the reduction of the Ukraine conflict to a ‘fight against a dangerous, unpredictable, evil man: Vladimir Putin’. This can be seen in the insult of the ‘Putin-’ or even ‘Russia-understanders’, but also in the ‘marginalisation of voices and news that contradict the prevailing narrative about the "aggressor Russia" and the West, which only defends noble goals.’ This other, missing perspective can be found in the book written by Mathias Bröckers and Paul Schreyer. It documents enough oddities in the development of this conflict ‘that would be reason to doubt its prevailing simple interpretation, to ask critical questions, to treat the claims not only of the Russian side, but also of the West and its allies in Ukraine with the greatest possible scepticism.’ The book is ultimately an appeal for more critical journalism, regardless of whether one agrees with all the analyses and whether the reader is ‘put off by the authors’ proximity to conspiracy theories’.

"It poses many uncomfortable questions about the role of the Americans and the West in the Ukraine conflict - but above all about the media, which scrutinise this role so little. [...] it leaves all the more the feeling that there is a void in the reporting of the established media. And this feeling is reinforced by the fact that there is no major debate about the book in those same media. That it is not seen as an opportunity to deal with the questions it raises - even if that means answering them soberly and clearly and contradicting the analysis."

== Bibliography ==
- Mathias Bröckers/Paul Schreyer: Wir sind die Guten. Ansichten eines Putinverstehers oder wie uns die Medien manipulieren. Westend Verlag, Frankfurt am Main 14. September 2014. ISBN 978-3-492-30800-7.
- Taschenbuchausgabe Piper Verlag 14. Januar 2016. EAN 978-3-492-30800-7
- Wir sind immer die Guten. Ansichten eines Putinverstehers oder wie der Kalte Krieg neu entfacht wird. Westend Verlag 22. Februar 2019 ISBN 978-3-86489-255-4.
