= Polycentric =

Polycentric is an English adjective, meaning "having more than one center," derived from the Greek words polús ("many") and kentrikós ("center"). Polycentricism (or polycentricity) is the abstract noun formed from polycentric. They may refer to:

- Polycentric law, a legal structure in which providers of legal systems compete or overlap in a given jurisdiction
- Polycentric chromosome, a chromosome with more than one centromere
- Polycentric language or pluricentric language, a language with several interacting codified standard versions
- Polycentric metropolitan area, an urban area that contains multiple urban agglomerations not connected by continuous development
- Polycentrism theory, a political theory developed by Palmiro Togliatti
- One leg of the EPG business model introduced by Howard V. Perlmutter
