= Wahl & Söhne =

Travel and holiday companies of Germany

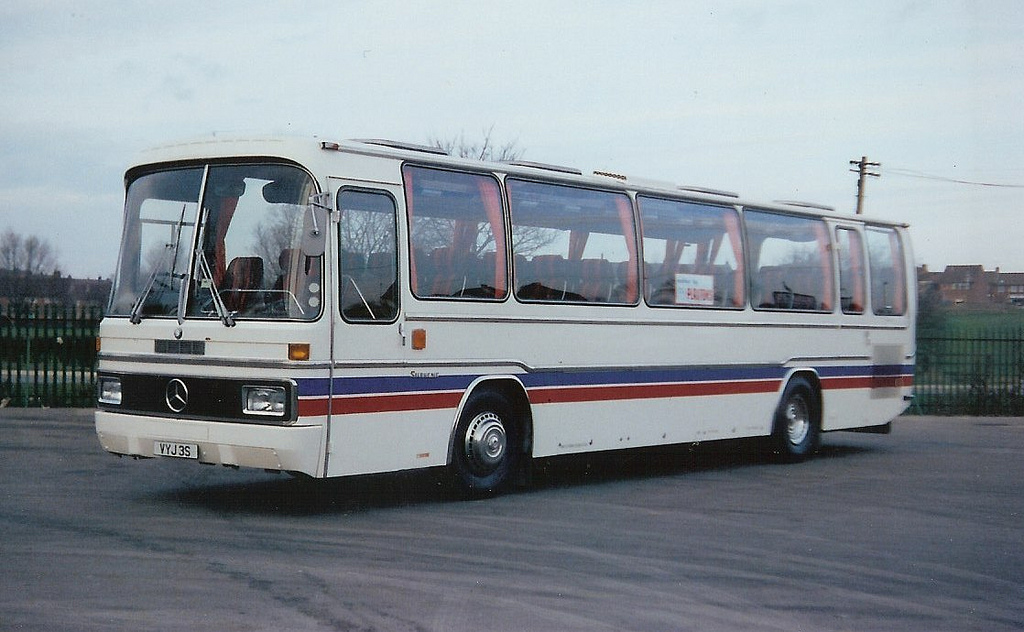
For their UK subsidiary, in 1978 Wahl purchased Mercedes coaches in "bare chassis form" and had them delivered to Yorkshire where they were fitted with local bodies. It was only after 1982, once Mercedes-Benz had been persuaded to supply steel bodied coaches with right hand drive, that Wahl's UK operation was able to switch to Mercedes bodied Mercedes-Benz O303 touring coaches similar to those used elsewhere (though still modified in order to respect the UK's unique regulatory requirements).

Wahl & Söhne KG (previously Wilhelm Wahl & Söhne and W. Wahl & Söhne KG) was a bus and coach operator based in Heidenheim an der Brenz between 1926 and 1986. By the 1970s Its principal activities involved providing touring coaches for international coach holidays and operating most of the local bus services in the Heidenheim district. With a fleet of around 400 buses and coaches, Wahl was believed to have become the largest privately owned bus company in Europe.

In 1986 the business underwent a high-profile bankruptcy. Dr. Fritz Wahl, who had by this time succeeded the elder generation and was in charge of the business, disappeared. Some time later he was located in Mexico: he faced a criminal investigation in connection with the company's financial collapse.

== History ==
On 6 August 1926 two brothers, Wilhelm (1903–1969) and Albert Wahl (1901–1976), set up a bus service between Heidenheim and nearby Schnaitheim. They operated the service with an 18-seat Ford bus. Just two months later they acquired a second bus.

Additional local routes were opened up to Oggenhausen, Voithsiedlung and Mergelstetten. From 1930 company contracts provided for further expansion, and cunning timetabling was also used to build passenger numbers. In a region where punctuality is highly valued, the Wahl buses were scheduled to depart just slightly earlier than the corresponding postbus services. At the railway station, while the postbus was still waiting for the letters and parcels to be loaded from the train, the Wahl bus was already departing, so that only a minority of slow moving passengers were left to use the postbus.

During the 1930s Wahl sought to compete with the railways, not simply locally along the Brenz valley, but further afield, offering direct travel to Stuttgart via Weißenstein and Göppingen at prices which significantly undercut those of the national rail company. The buses were well filled, but then the company were forbidden to operate along the route. In order to work around the prohibition the buses stopped short of central Stuttgart at suburbs such as Cannstatt or Untertürkheim from where passengers could complete their journeys by tram. Then these routes were also banned, which was enforced through police confiscation of buses between Göppingen und Stuttgart. At this point Wahl gave up on trying to compete with the trains on routes to Stuttgart. During the war the company buses and employees were conscripted for war work, and were even required to provide some of the services previously operated by the postbuses.

The postwar decades saw a massive increase in the population of Heidenheim and the surrounding region, fed by refugees from the east and economic migrants from the regions administered between 1945 and 1949 as the Soviet occupation zone. The registered population in the Heidenheim administrative district increased from 62,281 in 1939 to 111,300 in 1960. Recognising the needs and opportunities that the situation represented, Wahl created a town centre bus network supplemented with several adjacent cross-country bus routes. In 1947 the municipal authorities set up their own publicly funded rival operation, "Kraftverkehr Heidenheim GmbH", with routes connecting Heidenheim with Oberkochen and Giegen with Staufen. Six years later, in 1953, the municipality's public bus company was dissolved and its routes were taken over by Wahl and the national postbus operator.

In 1955 Wahl was operating 37 vehicles. By this time the economy of what had become, in May 1949, the German Federal Republic (West Germany), was growing strongly and disposable incomes were increasing to a point where many people could contemplate foreign holidays. Wahl itself grew strongly during the later 1950s and 1960s, both in respect of local bus services and of internationally used touring coaches. By the mid 1960s, with a fleet of over 70 buses and coaches, Wahl had become one of the largest private companies of its kind in West Germany. In Heidenheim a 30-minute frequency was introduced for the city buses, and additional suburbs such as Erbisberg and Mittelrain were added to the local network.

In 1970 a travel agency was opened at the Königstraße in Stuttgart. In 1971 an important contract was concluded with American Express for Wahl to provide touring coaches to be used for European coach tours sold to customers by American Express from America and other, mostly English speaking, countries outside Europe. Over the next few years similar deals were entered into with Global Tours and Trafalgar Tours. The company opened an international subsidiary, "Wahl International GmbH" in Frankfurt. Dr. Fritz Wahl took over the leadership of the business. The vehicle fleet grew from year to year, reaching 400 and comprising not simply Mercedes-Benz bus and coaches, but also those manufactured and / or powered by Setra, MAN and Magirus-Deutz.

In July 1983 Regine Wahl, Dr. Wahl's daughter, married Patrick Reynolds, the orphaned scion of a US tobacco dynasty. Various high-profile celebrities, including Prince Johannes of Thurn und Taxis, a Kashoggi heir and the widow of a former Mexican president, were guests at the "dream wedding" ceremony. The son in law went on to be employed in the family business. However, the marriage ended two years later, formally in 1985, and Reynolds would assert his notability not as a bus and coach operator, but as a movie actor and anti-tobacco activist.

The move into luxury international coach tourism was a great success. In 1984 Fritz Wahl spotted another international opportunity, this time in China. "It is instantly apparent what's wrong with China. So many people on bicycles, or walking long distances. They need motor transport, motor transport and then more motor transport." So he purchased a lot of used buses in West Germany and sold them on in China. Dr. Wahl was never shy of publicity, and the regional minister-president, Lothar Späth was present for the signing of one particularly large contract, for the sale of 500 buses in China.

In the mid-1980s, as Wahl expanded its business remit, ugly rumours began to circulate as to the company's solvency. There were suspicions that the expansion was, at best, injudiciously funded. The public bus network had been ringing up deficits for the years, while the tourist coach business was highly cyclical, and vulnerable to exchange rate fluctuations. The company structure, in practice, gave the chief executive and owner almost unconstrained freedom to run his business as he saw fit, and when he ran into cash flow difficulties he adopted what he would later identify as "emergency measures" ("Notmaßnahmen"). Buses were sold that he had not yet paid for, meaning that they were still the property of their manufacturers. Another variation involved securing bank debts against the value of buses which, since he had not paid for them, Wahl did not own. After the business began to unravel, it emerged that there were sometimes several banks who each thought they had first call on the same bus which they had accepted as collateral. When he found himself having to explain matters to a court, Dr. Wahl explained "I extinguished one fire with another fire. It was a kerfaffel (ein Kuddelmuddel)". Even the judge, Werner Meinhold, was unsure what to make of the matter: "It's all a bit very confused". In desperation Wahl turned to minister-president, Lothar Späth and Späth's colleague, the Baden-Württemberg's economics minister, Martin Herzog. There was talk of the regional government providing financial guarantees. But now events assumed their own momentum. The company applied for a "scheme of arrangement" ("Vergleichsantrag") with its creditors, but such an arrangement would have required the agreement of creditors and of the court. What followed for the company, in May 1986, was a compulsory bankruptcy. A day later Dr. Wahl and his wife disappeared, leaving behind them a shortfall of fifty million marks. An international arrest warrant was issued, but there could be no arrest while the doctor's whereabouts remained unknown.

Dr Wahl was located and, in August 1989, arrested in Mexico City. It is hard to know how much effort had been made to locate him in the intervening years. Two investigative journalists, Oliver Schröm and Stefan Scheytt, made their way to Mexico City, hoping to be able to interview Wahl in his jail cell. They found that he was listed in the city telephone directory, and they were able to use the information in the directory to visit his home where they found his wife, Lotte. Fritz Wahl had been working hard in the industry he knew, as a consultant with a Mexican bus manufacturer. The reporters returned to West Germany with enough material to support a series of articles. However, Dr. Wahl refused to receive them in his Mexican prison cell.

As matters turned out, at the time when he was found in Mexico Dr Wahl still had not sold on all his unpaid for buses, nor handed them over to the banks who had accepted them as security on debts. Back in Germany, in May 1991 Fritz Wahl received a three-and-a-half-year jail term for deception and embezzlement. After he had served his sentence he went back to live in Mexico where, in 2008, he died.

The Württemberg Railway Company and the municipality teamed up to launch the Heidenheimer Verkehrsgesellschaft (HVG / Heidenheim [public] Transport Company) on 1 May 1987, using assets recovered following the Wahl bankruptcy. By that time the luxury coach fleet had already disappeared from the company books, during its unsuccessful struggle for survival. HVG is focused on scheduled services, with only very limited involvement in private hire and one-time contracts.
