= Nikolaus Paryla =

Austrian actor and stage director (born 1939)

Nikolaus Paryla (born 19 November 1939, in Zurich) is an Austrian actor and stage director.

== Biography ==
Paryla studied acting at the Academy of Music and Performing Arts at the Max Reinhardt Seminar in Vienna.

In 1961, he received his first engagement at Vienna's Wiener Volkstheater as Moritz Stiefel in Frank Wedekind's Spring Awakening (Frühlings Erwachen), directed by Gustav Manker, after which he was engaged until 1969 at the Theater in der Josefstadt, also in Vienna. Between 1970 and 1971, Paryla belonged to the ensemble of Berlin's Schiller Theater, after which he stood until 1986 on the stage of Munich's Residence Theatre.

In films, he is known for roles in Kehraus (1983) and Das Schloß (1997). Paryla won the Hersfeld-Preis in 1980.

=== Selected filmography ===
- 1960: Das Zaubermännchen
- 1979: Lena Rais
- 1979: Der ganz normale Wahnsinn (television series)
- 1982: The Confessions of Felix Krull (television miniseries)
- 1983: Kehraus
- 1988: Heimatmuseum (television miniseries)
- 1988: Mit Leib und Seele (television series)
- 1995: Ant Street
- 1995: Rudy, the Racing Pig
- 1995: Rohe Ostern (television film)
- 1997: The Castle (television film)
- 1998: Solo for Clarinet
- 1999: Geliebte Gegner (television film)
- 2000: Polt muss weinen
- 2001: Zwölfeläuten
- 2001: Tatort – Im freien Fall (part of TV-series)
- 2003: Pumuckl und sein Zirkusabenteuer (part of a television series)
- 2004: Schimanski: Das Geheimnis des Golem (part of TV-series)
- 2005: Marias's Last Journey (television film)
- 2005: The Young Schiller (television film)
- 2006: The Crown Prince (television film)
- 2008: Tatort – Der glückliche Tod (part of a television series)
- 2009: Tatort – Wir sind die Guten (part of a television series)
- 2010: Länger Leben
- 2012: Don't You Believe It!
