= We Weren't Given Anything for Free =

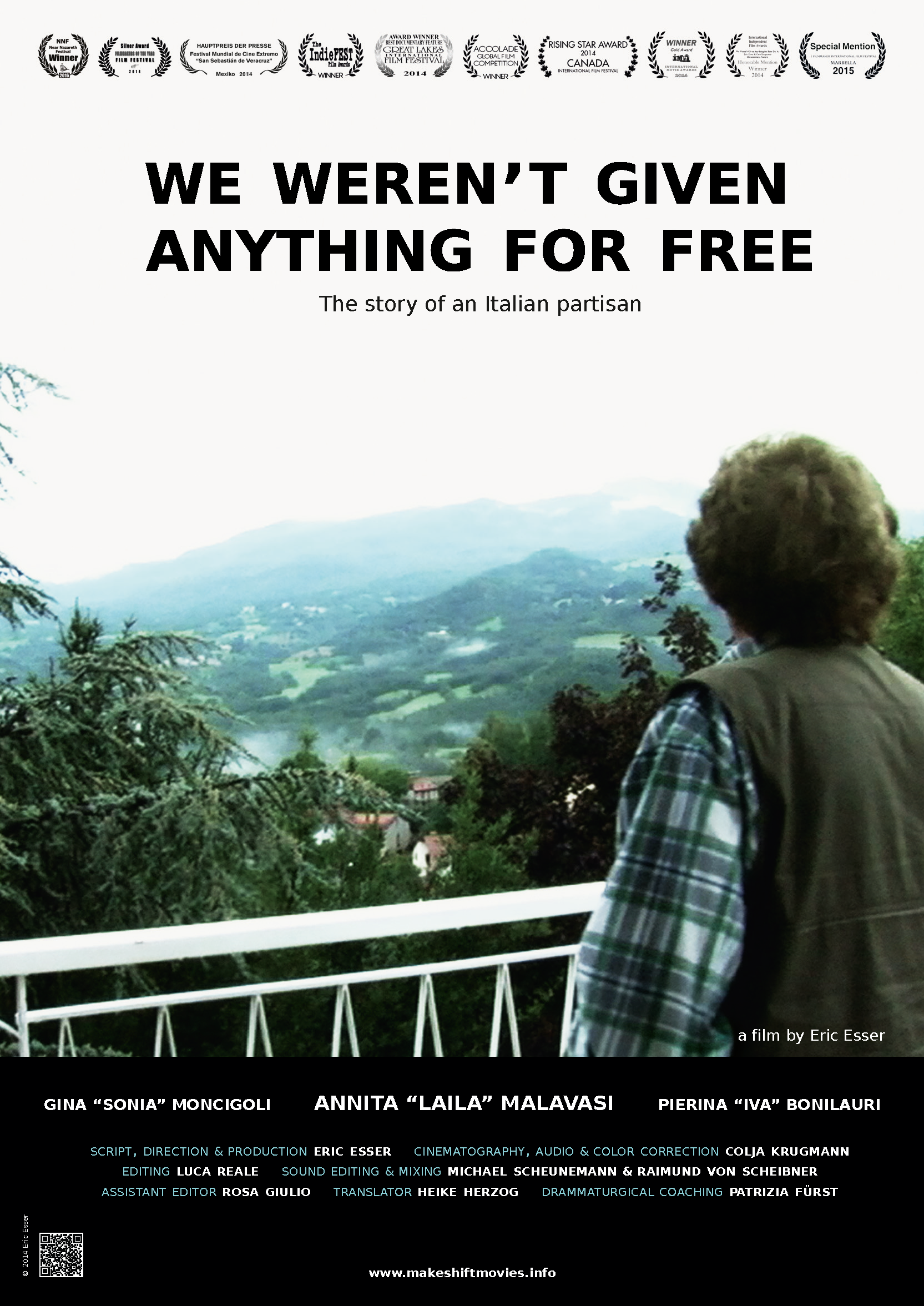
- English film poster
- Italian: Non ci è stato regalato niente
- Directed by: Eric Esser
- Produced by: Eric Esser
- Starring: Annita "Laila" Malavasi; Gina "Iva" Moncigoli; Pierina "Iva" Bonilauri
- Cinematography: Colja Krugmann
- Edited by: Luca Reale
- Distributed by: MakeShiftMovies
- Release date: January 20, 2014
- Running time: 58 minutes
- Country: Germany
- Language: Italian

We Weren't Given Anything for Free (Italian: Non ci è stato regalato niente) is an Italian language 2014 documentary film directed and produced by Eric Esser. The film is a portrayal of former partisan and later trade unionist Annita Malavasi, who, using the code name Laila, counted as one of the few high-ranked women in command in the Italian Resistance Movement during the German occupation of Italy in the Second World War.

== Synopsis ==
The film deals with the Italian resistance in the Second World War from the perspective of women who were communist partisans. In a series of interviews, the protagonist Malavasi tells about her career as a resistance fighter. The chronological narration begins with the occupation of the country by German troops on 8 September 1943 (see the Armistice of Cassibile) and ends with its liberation on 25 April 1945. During this time period, Malavasi goes from being a support for her brother, to going underground, to commanding her own unit in the mountains. Over the course of the film, she visits her friends Gina Moncigoli and Pierina Bonilauri, both former resistance fighters she had met during the war. For these three women, their experience in the resistance constituted the beginning of their own emancipation within a patriarchal society.

== History ==
We Weren't Given Anything for Free had its premier on 20 January 2014 at the Festival Mundial de Cine Extremo San Sebastián in Veracruz, Mexico. Its European premiere took place on 10 March at the FrauenFilmTage 2014 in Vienna, the Italian premiere shortly thereafter on 22 March 2014 at the Women's Film Festival Sguardi Altrove in Milan.

According to the film's website, it was financially supported by the solidarity fund from the Hans-Böckler-Stiftung educational scholarship. The historical institute in Reggio Emilia, Istoreco, holds the rights to all archive images; it provided logistical support to the film.

== Critical reception ==
In explaining their reasons for granting the award, the jury of the Festival Mundial de Cine Extremo San Sebastián said that the film "offered up persuasive insight into the importance of the role played by patriotic partisans in the Second World War in Italy", while also citing its "perfect cinematic realization of the subject matter".

The author Ingrid Strobl blogged about the film, writing that until now only "insiders" had known about the participation of Italian women in the partisan fight, that this discussion had been "bitterly missing" in Germany. The filmmaker Eric Esser was "not only successful at telling those three partisans' story, providing insight into the motivations and the participation of many others in the process. He was also able to move the women to speak about their feelings and their personal experiences in an unadorned way. In doing so, he lends the film a sense of depth that goes beyond hero worship, retroactively showing appreciation for the women's bravery and historic service, something sorely lacking until now. A wonderful film, which I hope is seen by many people."

In December 2014, the journalist Marcus Hammerschmitt wrote in the online magazine Telepolis, that the film did not provide the viewers with "any kind of Bandiera Rossa romanticism or military fetishism – instead, it told the story of three women who, during a certain part of their lives, made decisions that demanded respect." Despite their sacrifices, which are terrible to hear, their story of the resistance is also that of a resistance against male dominant behavior and female assimilation. Considering the historic events dealt with in this film and the fact that it originated thanks to a team from Germany, "one could think of it as an act of experienced reconciliation and international understanding. Therefore, Geschenkt wurde uns nichts should not only be shown at small festivals, it should be shown, for instance, on television – and in a really good broadcasting slot."

== Awards ==
- The press jury at the Festival Mundial de Cine Extremo San Sebastián in Veracruz (Mexico) awarded the Lorenzo-Arduengo Press Award to the film on 24 January 2014.
- At the Canada International Film Festival in Vancouver in March 2014, it received a Rising Star Award in the student film competition category.
- In 2014, at the Accolade Global Film Competition in La Jolla /San Diego, U.S., it was honored with an Award of Merit.
- The film received another Award of Merit in May 2014 at the Indie Fest Film Awards in the U.S.
- At the International Movie Awards 2014 in Jakarta, Indonesia, the film was given a Gold Award in September 2014 in the short documentary film category.
- In the summer of 2014, the film was recognized at the International Independent Film Awards in the U.S. with an honorable mention.
- On 28 September 2014, the jury chose Geschenkt wurde uns nichts as the best long documentary film at the Great Lakes International Film Festival in the U.S.
