= Armin Medosch =

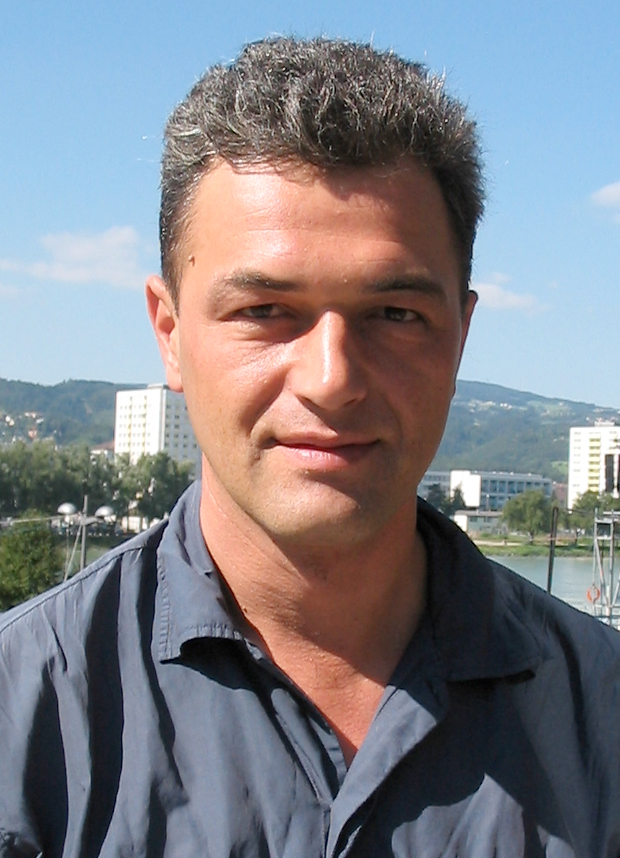
Armin Medosch (2004)

Armin Medosch (1962–2017) was an Austrian artist, curator, theorist and critic working in the fields of net.art, new media art and DiY networking.

== Biography ==
Medosch was born in Graz. He received his PhD from the Goldsmiths with research on the New Tendencies movement. As a journalist he wrote extensively on art and technology for publications in German and English, and on lists such as Nettime. From 1996 to 2002 he was co-editor of Telepolis: The Magazine of Netculture. For many years he collaborated with media art organisation RIXC co-editing issues of their Acoustic Space Journal and co-curating exhibitions, and collaborated with artist Shu Lea Cheang on the Kingdom of Piracy project. Medosch previously taught on the MA course on Interactive Digital Media at Ravensbourne (college), London (2002–2007).

Medosch died of cancer in 2017, in Vienna.

== Publications ==
- Luksch, Manu & Medosch, Armin (eds), Arts Servers Unlimited (Booklet), London: 1998
- Medosch, Armin. Freie Netze. Geschichte, Politik und Kultur offener WLAN-Netze, Heidelberg: dpunkt, 2003]
- Medosch, Armin. "Society in Ad-hoc Mode: Decentralised, Self-Organising, Mobile", in Cox, Geoff, Krysa, Joasia & Lewin, Anya (eds), DATA browser 01. ECONOMISING CULTURE: On The (Digital) Culture Industry, New York: Autonomedia, 2004, pp. 121–146
- Medosch, Armin. "Auf freien Wellenlängen: Funknetze als techno-soziale Entwürfe", in Lutterbeck Bernd, Bärwolff, Matthias & Gehring, Robert A. (eds), Open Source Jahrbuch 2006, Berlin: Lehmanns Media, 2006, pp. 389–404
- Medosch, Armin. "On Free Wavelengths: Wireless Networks as Techno-Social Models", in Luksch, Manu & Patel, Mukul (eds), Ambient Information Systems, London: AIS, 2009, pp. 98–115
- Luksch, Manu & Medosch, Armin. "Broadband Talks: From 24 Frames to 24 Hours ", in Luksch, Manu & Patel, Mukul (eds), Ambient Information Systems, London: AIS, 2009, pp. 54–56
- Medosch, Armin. "Four Layers of Freedom", in Luksch, Manu & Patel, Mukul (eds), Ambient Information Systems, London: AIS, 2009, p. 58
- Medosch, Armin. "ambientTV.NET: Open Doors, Open Processes", in Luksch, Manu & Patel, Mukul (eds), Ambient Information Systems, London: AIS, 2009, pp. 336–368
- Medosch, Armin. "Shockwaves in the New World Order of Information and Communication", in Paul, Christiane (ed), A Companion to Digital Art, Hoboken: Wiley-Blackwell, 2014, pp 355–383
- Medosch, Armin. New Tendencies: Art at the Threshold of The Information Revolution 1961-1978, Cambridge: MIT Press, 2016
- Medosch, Armin. The Rise of the Network Commons: A History of Community Infrastructure, Amsterdam: Institute of Network Cultures, 2025
