= Eliminators (1986 film) =

- Theatrical release poster
- Directed by: Peter Manoogian
- Written by: Paul De Meo; Danny Bilson
- Produced by: Charles Band
- Starring: Andrew Prine; Denise Crosby; Patrick Reynolds; Conan Lee; Roy Dotrice
- Cinematography: Mac Ahlberg
- Edited by: Andy Horvitch
- Music by: Bob Summers
- Distributed by: Empire Pictures
- Release date: January 31, 1986
- Running time: 96 minutes
- Countries: United States; Spain
- Language: English
- Box office: $4,601,256

Eliminators is a 1986 science fiction action film directed by Peter Manoogian, starring Andrew Prine, Denise Crosby and Patrick Reynolds. The plot centers on a "Mandroid" constructed by an evil scientist from the body of a downed pilot, who teams up with the scientist responsible for android technology, her pet robot Spot, a riverboat guide and a martial arts warrior.

== Plot ==
After returning from a scouting mission in a time machine, the Mandroid gives a Roman centurion shield to his master Abbot Reeves. Reeves orders the Mandroid to be dismantled (killed), but Reeves' assistant Takada tries to help the Mandroid to escape. Although Takada dies in the escape attempt, he tells the Mandroid to seek scientist Col. Nora Hunter for help in stopping Reeves from enacting an evil plan. In the U.S., the Mandroid finds Hunter and reveals himself to her. She believed Reeves to be dead and recognizes her designs for a Mars probe in the Mandroid. She repairs damage done to the Mandroid in his escape. The Mandroid plans to return to stop Reeves' evil plans (whatever they may be) and Hunter insists on accompanying him as his mechanic. She also brings along S.P.O.T., a small flying scout robot of her own design.

Arriving in Mexico, Hunter hires the best river boat captain she can find in a seedy bar, Harry Fontana, and they head down a river. After running afoul of rival riverboat captains and Reeves' men, they end up finding the Mandroid's crashed plane after an encounter with a tribe of cavemen brought to this time by Reeves' time travel experiments. They also meet Kuji, the ninja son of Doctor Takada, who has come to find his father. The Mandroid informs him that his father is dead, killed by Reeves. He joins the group, which then storms Reeves' headquarters, only to be captured by Reeves, now a cyborg himself, more advanced than the Mandroid, whose body is designed to look like Roman armor. Reeves plans to travel back to ancient Rome and become the new Caesar.

The Mandroid fights Reeves and is quickly defeated. Badly damaged, the Mandroid sacrifices his life to free the rest of the group. They pursue Reeves to his laboratory just in time to watch him escape to ancient Rome in his time machine. In frustration, Fontana smashes the laboratory control panel, causing the time machine to overshoot its target date and maroon Reeves hundreds of millions of years in the past.

== Cast ==
- Andrew Prine as Harry Fontana, riverboat captain.
- Denise Crosby as Colonel Nora Hunter, scientist.
- Patrick Reynolds as Mandroid / John, a pilot who crashed in South America and turned into the cybernetic tool of Abbott Reeves.
- Conan Lee as Kuji, ninja son of Doctor Takada.
- Roy Dotrice as Abbott Reeves, evil scientist.
- Peter Schrum as Ray
- Peggy Mannix as Betty "Bayou Betty", the evil rival riverboat captain to Harry.
- Fausto Bara as Luis
- Tad Horino as Takada, the good scientist assistant to Reeves.
- Luis Lorenzo as Maurice
- José Moreno as Neanderthal Shaman (credited as Pepe Moreno)
- Charly Bravo as The Bartender
- Miguel de Grandy as Chief Guard (credited as Miguel de Grandi)
- Gabino Diego as Young Guard (credited as Gabino Diego Solis)

== Release ==
Released in January 1986, the film grossed $4,601,256.

=== Home media ===
The film was released on videocassette by Playhouse Video, the children's video division of CBS/FOX Video, in the U.S., and by Cineplex Odeon in Canada.

On July 9, 2013, Shout! Factory (under license from MGM) released Eliminators as part of a four movie "SciFi Movie Marathon" set along with Arena, America 3000 and The Time Guardian on region 1 DVD.

On December 15, 2015 Shout! Factory released Eliminators on a double feature Blu-ray along with The Dungeonmaster.

On February 27, 2017 88 Films released Eliminators on a combo Blu-ray DVD release.

== In popular culture ==
The "Ferris Club" creators Classy Hands parodied Eliminators with a fake commercial in a fall 2010 release of their website.

Director Steven Kostanski has said on numerous occasions that this film was the initial (and main) inspiration for his sci-fi parody Manborg.
