= Deutsche Journalistenschule =

German journalism school in Munich, Bavaria

Coordinates: 48°08′14″N 11°34′15″E

Logo

The Deutsche Journalistenschule e.V. (German: [ˈdɔʏtʃə ʒʊʁnaˈlɪstn̩ˌʃuːlə]), the German School of Journalism, is a journalism school in Germany. At the time of its establishment, it was the country's first German journalism school. Today, Deutsche Journalistenschule is considered one of the best schools for journalism in Germany, along with the Henri-Nannen-Schule in Hamburg.

== History ==
It was founded in 1949 by Werner Friedmann, co-editor of Süddeutsche Zeitung. He modeled the school after the Columbia University Graduate School of Journalism, which he saw while visiting the United States of America. The original name of the school, Werner Friedmann Institute, was later changed into Deutsche Journalistenschule e.V. (DJS), which means German School of Journalism.

For the following decades, DJS was the only professional school for journalism in West-Germany. Its students are taught by professional journalists of prominent German media outlets like Der Spiegel, Süddeutsche Zeitung or ARD. Only 45 students are accepted every year. The curriculum consists of classes in writing, research, TV-producing and others. In her speech on the school's 60th anniversary, Chancellor Angela Merkel called the DJS "a good piece of the success story of the Bundesrepublik Deutschland". Many editors-in-chief of renowned German newspapers and magazines were once students of the DJS.

In May 2012, the school moved from the former location in the heart of the city centre (Altheimer Eck) to the east of Munich (Hultschiner Straße 8), sharing the address with the Süddeutsche Verlag, the publishing house of Süddeutsche Zeitung. The school is currently led by Henriette Loewisch.

== Notable alumni (selection) ==
- Götz Aly, journalist and historian
- Alice Bota, Die Zeit
- Maxim Biller, writer
- Günther Jauch, TV host
- Kurt Kister, editor-in-chief of Süddeutsche Zeitung
- Timm Klotzek, editor-in-chief of Süddeutsche Zeitung Magazin
- Ludger Kühnhardt, political scientist
- Sandra Maischberger, TV host
- Bastian Obermayer, investigative journalist
- Jan-Eric Peters, editor-in-chief of Die Welt
- Andreas Petzold, former editor-in-chief and now publisher of Der Stern
- Walther von La Roche, journalist
- Christine Westermann, TV and radio host
- Ulrich Wilhelm, director of Bayerischer Rundfunk (BR).
