= Jochen Schmidt =

German author and translator (born 1970)

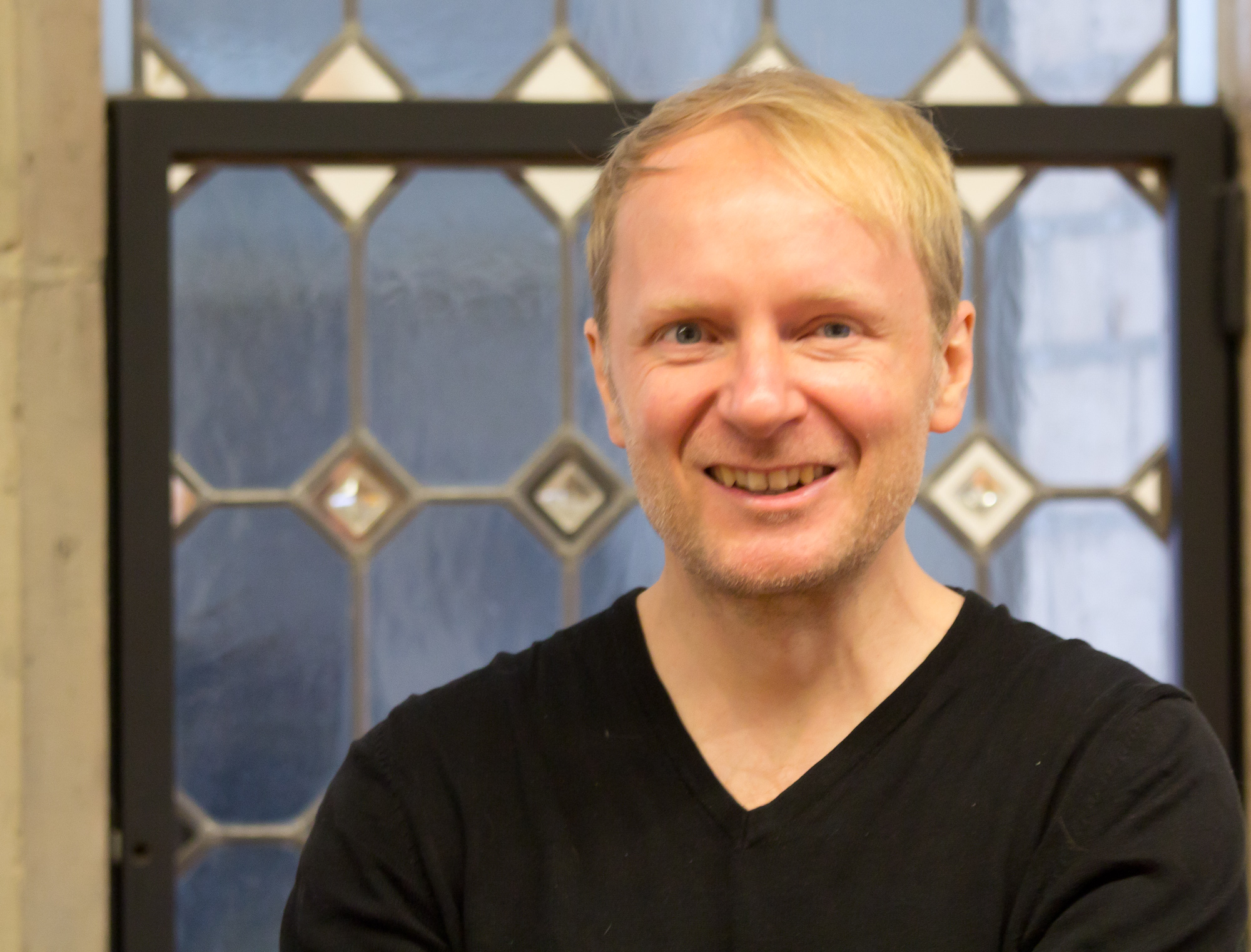
Jochen Schmidt in 2014

Jochen Schmidt (born 9 November 1970 in East Berlin) is a German author and translator. Initially, Schmidt gained popularity in Germany with his story “Harnusch mäht als wär’s ein Tanz” (English "Harnusch mows the lawn as if it were a dance") for which he was awarded the Open Mic Prize of the Literary Workshop Berlin (Literaturwerkstatt Berlin). In 2007, he was a finalist for the prestigious Ingeborg Bachmann Prize.

His books to date include six novels, four volumes of short stories or shorter prose texts, and a highly respected book on Marcel Proust. He is an active member of the German National Authors' Soccer Team ("Autonama," Deutsche Autorennationalmannschaft).

== Life ==
Jochen Schmidt is the son of two linguists. Because of the academic, as well as Christian orientation of his family, they displayed a certain distance to the GDR regime. Until the eighth grade, Schmidt attended a "Polytechnische Oberschule" (POS) in Berlin-Buch, and from 1985 until his Abitur, an "Erweiterte Oberschule" for mathematically gifted students.

In 2017, Schmidt shared a literature-related memory with the MDR journalist Claudius Nießen, namely that he had attended the Leipzig Book Fair once during the times of the GDR. Schmidt describes the experience as almost surreal, with the publishing houses from West Germany putting their books on the tables for display. One thing he did not know at the time, he states, was that a lot of people were stealing the books from the West at the fair.

Following his military service in the NVA, Schmidt began studying Computer Science at the Humboldt University in Berlin, shortly after the Fall of the Wall. Soon after, he changed his subjects at the university to Romance Languages and German Studies, at the Humboldt University, and also in Bukarest. In the context of these studies, he spent time abroad in Brest, Valencia, Rome, New York City, and Moscow. Especially his stays in Brittany, Spain, and the U.S. inspired parts of Schmidt's first novel Müller haut uns raus (engl. Müller bails us out; 2002). After completing his studies, he held a job at the university and worked as a translator into German. It was during this time that he started writing creatively.

In 1999, he was awarded the Open Mic Prize of the Literary Workshop Berlin for his story "Harnusch mäht als wär's ein Tanz." That same year, he became a founding member of the Reading Stage "Chaussee der Enthusiasten" (engl. "Avenue of Enthusiasts") that existed until 2015. The "Chaussee der Enthusiasten" held its reading events initially at the pub die tagung, and later at the RAW Friedrichshain in Berlin. Another location was the Frannz-Club in the Prenzlauer Berg neighborhood. In addition to Schmidt, regulars at the reading stage included Andreas Kampa, Stephan Serin, Robert Naumann, and Dan Richter. Jochen Schmidt's first book publication took place in 2000 with the collection of short prose Triumphgemüse. It appeared with the prestigious publishing house C.H. Beck (Munich). A paperback edition followed from Deutscher Taschenbuch Verlag (dtv). In Schmidt's author profile on the website of the International Literary Festival Berlin, we are told that his debut "impresses with its endless series of bizarre characters, parading their brittle dignity. This hyper-realistic examination of numerous episodes from the era following the fall of the Berlin Wall, embedded in a mild melancholia, extracts a laconic power from its characters – as for example in the prize-winning story 'Harnusch mäht als wärs ein Tanz', masterfully giving rhythm to every text."

At the time of the publication of Triumphgemüse, Schmidt gave an interview to Fridtjof Küchemann of the Frankfurter Allgemeine Zeitung in which he admitted that he generally read very little, and if he did, he would read books by "Classics of Modernism." He mentioned Thomas Mann, Heiner Müller, and Thomas Bernhard as models among German-language authors.

Then, in 2002, Jochen Schmidt's first novel follows, Müller haut uns raus, and, interestingly enough, the name of its first-person narrator is Jochen Schmitt -- just one letter in the last name is different. As was the case with his first book, Müller bails us out is first published as a hardback with C.H. Beck, and then as a paperback with dtv. In an effort to determine the genre of Schmidt's novel with greater precision, literary critics have vacillated between "experiential report," picaresque novel, and "the portrait of the artist as a young man."

For more than 40 years, the Piper publishing house in Munich, has maintained a series called "Gebrauchsanweisungen" (engl. user manuals). These "User Manuals" are designed to be travel guides of a special kind. In 2004, very likely by virtue of his intimate knowledge of the place because of his time studying abroad there, Jochen Schmidt published his User Manual for Brittany (Gebrauchsanweisung für die Bretagne) with Piper. He ended up contributing four books to the series so far. After the book on Brittany, Gebrauchsanweisung für Rumänien (User Manual for Romania) appeared in 2013. In 2015, Gebrauchsanweisung für Ostdeutschland followed, and, most recently, Piper published Gebrauchsanweisung fürs Laufen (User Manual for Running) in 2019.

The year 2006 saw the launch of two major projects by Jochen Schmidt. The first project, which stirred a lot of attention to the author, relates to a feeling that a lot of people who enjoy reading may be familiar with: we always have books -- and often they are very long, if not monumental, books -- that we had always wanted to read. One such work was Marcel Proust's seven volumes of In Search of Lost Time. This constituted a major task since, altogether, the seven volumes demand of the reader to read more than 3000 pages. In July 2006, Schmidt started reading twenty pages of Proust's work each day, and contributed a daily entry about what he had read on a blog entitled Schmidt liest Proust (engl. Schmidt reads Proust). Following the completion of the project, the author transformed the contents of the blog into a book that appeared in 2008 with the publishing house Voland & Quist.

The year 2007 brought one of the most decisive events in Schmidt's career, his participation at the prestigious Ingeborg Bachmann Prize in Klagenfurt, Austria. His second collection of short prose, My Most Important Bodily Functions, is published during the same year.

2011: Dudenbrooks with the faz.net 2013: Schneckenmühle

In an interview with Deutschlandfunk Kultur, journalist Frank Meyer inquired with Schmidt about architecture being a dominant them of his novel A Job for Otto Kwant, (German Ein Auftrag für Otto Kwant) which appeared with the publisher C.H. Beck on 3 April 2019 in Munich. The author responded that architecture had always been one of the means for him to read and understand a city; once we inquire about a building in a city we don't know, we are confronted with our own incompetence, which brings us to ask and read more. "It is similar to botany: the more you know, the more you see."

On September 12, 2022, the C.H. Beck publishing house published Schmidt's novel Phlox which tells the story of a family that takes one last vacation at a beloved house in the Oderbruch region of Eastern Germany. The novel received very favorable reviews in the German Press. The Frankfurter Allgemeine Zeitung called Phlox a "stylistically outstanding kaleidoscope of Eastern German childhood and of the present of unified Germany." Harald Eggebrecht emphasizes in Süddeutsche Zeitung the magical quality of Schmidt's narration, and praises especially the transition from idyllic memories to the darker aspects of the story. "As soon as Schmidt, without hesitation, digs up experiences of war and escape, the conditions of the survival of the people of Schmogrow and those who ended up there, the realities of Nazi rule and the horrors of Soviet occupation surface without any moralizing attitude. Schmidt sticks to his principle of uninterrupted storytelling which he doesn't disrupt or obscure with dishonestly profound musings or detached reflections."

== Works ==
=== Novels ===
- Müller haut uns raus. München: C.H. Beck Verlag, 2002. (engl. Müller bails us out)
- Schneckenmühle. München: C.H. Beck Verlag, 2013. (engl. Snail Mill)
- Zuckersand. München: C.H. Beck Verlag, 2017. (engl. Sugar Sand)
- Ein Auftrag für Otto Kwant. München: C.H. Beck Verlag, 2019. (engl. A Job for Otto Kwant)
- Phlox. München: C.H. Beck Verlag, 2022.
- Hoplopoiia. München: C.H. Beck Verlag, 2025.

=== Short story collections ===
- Triumphgemüse. München: C.H. Beck Verlag, 2000. (engl. Triumphant Vegetables)
- Meine wichtigsten Körperfunktionen. München: C.H. Beck Verlag, 2007. (engl. My Most Important Bodily Functions)
- Der Wächter von Pankow. München: C.H. Beck Verlag, 2015. (engl. The Guard of Pankow)
- Ich weiß noch, wie King Kong starb: Ein Florilegium. München: C.H. Beck Verlag, 2021. (engl. I Still Remember How King Kong Died)

=== Translations ===
- Guy Delisle. Szenzhen. Berlin-Wedding: Reprodukt Verlag, 2005. (French into German)
- Guy Delisle. Pjöngjang. Berlin-Wedding: Reprodukt Verlag, 2007. (French into German)

=== Travel books ===
- Gebrauchsanweisung für die Bretagne. München: Piper Verlag, 2004. (engl. User Manual for Brittany)
- Gebrauchsanweisung für Rumänien. München: Piper Verlag, 2013. (engl. User Manual for Romania)
- Gebrauchsanweisung für Ostdeutschland. München: Piper Verlag, 2015. (engl. User Manual for East Germany)
- Gebrauchsanweisung fürs Laufen. München: Piper Verlag, 2019. (engl. User Manual for Running)

=== Other ===
- Schmidt liest Proust. Dresden, Germany: Voland & Quist, 2009. Paperback edition: Schmidt liest Proust: Die Quadratur der Krise. München: btb, 2010. (engl. Schmidt reads Proust.)
- (with Line Hoven) Dudenbrooks: Geschichten aus dem Wörterbuch. Berlin: Jacoby & Stuart, 2011.
- (with Line Hoven) Schmythologie: Wer kein Griechisch kann, kann gar nichts. München: C.H. Beck, 2019.
- (with Line Hoven) Paargespräche. München: C.H. Beck, 2020.

== Awards ==
- 1999: Open Mic ("Open Mike") Prize of the Literary Workshop Berlin (Literaturwerkstatt Berlin, today: Haus für Poesie)
- 2002: Audience Award at the Steirischer Herbst (an annual festival in Graz, Styria for contemporary art)
- 2004: Kassel Literary Prize; ("Förderpreis," engl. advancement award, for writers under 35)
- 2007: Participation at the Ingeborg-Bachmann-Prize in Klagenfurt, Carinthia; nominated by Ursula März. Schmidt read the text "Abschied aus einer Umlaufbahn"
- 2009: Southwest Broadcasting List of the Best in Literature ("Bestenliste Literatur"), February 2009. Schmidt liest Proust (Schmidt reads Proust).
- 2026: Joseph-Breitbach-Preis
