= Mathias Bröckers =

German journalist and writer

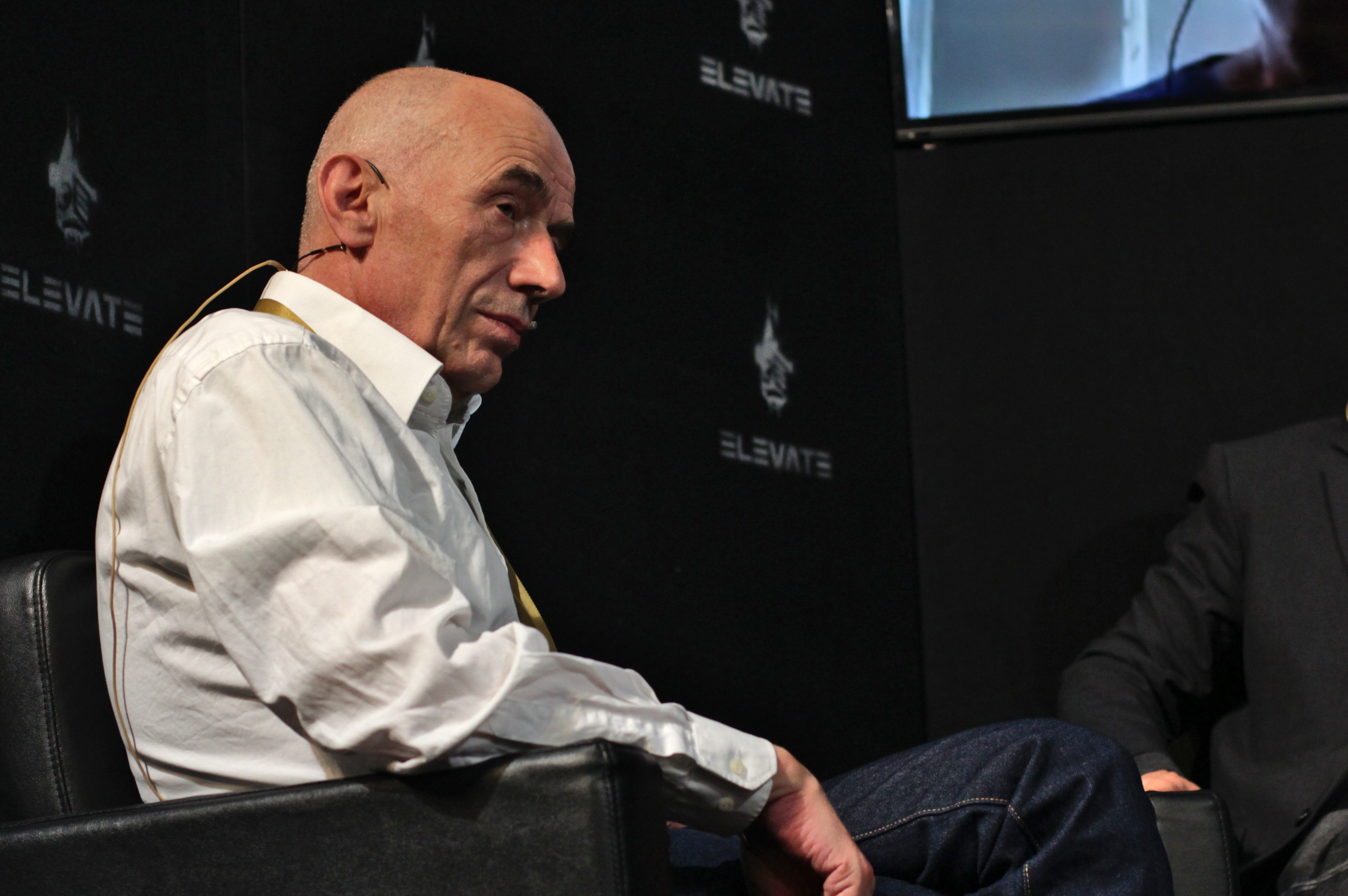
- Mathias Bröckers at the Elevate Festival 2019 in Graz, Austria
- Born: 26 June 1954 (age 72); Limburg an der Lahn, Hesse, Germany
- Occupations: German writer, journalist, and blogger
- Website: https://www.broeckers.com/

Mathias Bröckers (born 26 June 1954) is a German journalist, publicist, political blogger and author, co-author or editor of political monographs, and novels (with Sven Böttcher). He was co-founder, culture and science editor of the taz, and from 2006 its online consultant. He worked as a columnist for Die Zeit and Die Woche and as a science editor for ARD radio.

Of his total of some 71 publications as author, co-author, or editor, Die Wiederentdeckung der Nutzpflanze Hanf ("The Rediscovery of Hemp as a Crop" with Jack Herer, 1993) and Verschwörungen, Verschwörungstheorien und die Geheimnisse des 11.9. ("Conspiracies, Conspiracy Theories, and the Mysteries of 9/11", 2002) were international best-sellers. The first edition of Wir sind die Guten ("We are the good guys"), written with Paul Schreyer (2014/2019) was in the Spiegel-Bestsellerliste for nonfiction.

Bröckers positions are partly controversial. His explanatory approaches, especially to the terrorist attacks of 11 September 2001, to the assassination of John F. Kennedy and to Julian Assange are classified as conspiracy theories. He advocates the legalization of drugs, especially of hemp.

== Life ==
According to his own statements, Bröckers was active in his youth as an altar boy, choirboy, footballer, and boy scout, among other things. In 1973, he graduated from the humanistic grammar school Tilemannschule in Limburg.

After graduating from high school, Bröckers moved to West Berlin to avoid his draft. That same year, he began studying at the FU Berlin literary studies, linguistics and political science with German and Politics for the teaching profession. To finance his studies, he obtained a passenger transport license in 1976 and joined Berlin's first cab collective.

He graduated in 1980 as a senior high school teacher of German and Politics. His master's thesis on the Role of Language in Psychoanalysis received the grade "With Distinction."

From 1980 to 1991 he worked first as culture editor, later also as science editor of the taz. During this time he published his first book in 1985 with texts by the Berlin cabaret artist Wolfgang Neuss.

In 1989 he published the documentary Die taz – das Buch on the occasion of the paper's tenth anniversary. It was published by Zweitausendeins, which later became his house publisher.

In 1991, together with Karl Wegmann, he established the satire page "Die Wahrheit" for fake news in the TAZ. In addition, he was a columnist for Zeit, the Woche and author of natural science radio programs for the SFB.

In 2006, he was involved in the Internet launch of the taz, making blogs by editors and friends of the taz freely readable online. He also dealt with Internet marketing. Until his retirement from the taz in 2020 due to age, he was responsible for the tazblog as the official blog keeper.

Wolfgang Neuss aroused his interest in cannabis, or hemp, and its various uses since the early 1980s. In several publications, Bröcker devoted himself to educating people about this ancient cultivated plant and also its criminalization and pathologization of consumers by the U.S. media czar Randolph Hearst in the 1930s.

In 1993, with friends, he developed the business idea of a wholesale business exclusively with products produced on the basis of hemp. The following year, he became Managing Partner of HanfHaus GmbH, which had to file for insolvency at the end of 2001. He also campaigned for the reauthorization of hemp cultivation as chairman of the "Hanfgesellschaft e. V. (Hemp Society)".

In 2001, he resigned from the HanfHaus management and returned to work as a freelance author and journalist. He also gave his journalistic attention to other psychotropics such as LSD and absinthe.

== Journalism ==
His genre-spectrum ranges from contributions to books and anthologies, radio programs, cabaret programs, to collaboration on TV and film scripts, editing and publishing activities, to lectures, workshops and novels. He was also a member of the non-fiction jury of the Süddeutsche Zeitung.

He edited the German translation of the Lexicon of Conspiracy Theories by Robert Anton Wilson.

By his own account, he has an artistic self-image and dismisses the question, "What do you really believe?" He says he is aware that conspiracy theories may be contradictory among themselves. He researches them as a social phenomenon primarily with the help of the Internet.

In his 2013 book JFK – Coup d'état in America he points out unexplained contradictions in the case of the assassination of John F. Kennedy and insinuates a coup d'état-type conspiracy by CIA, FBI and other actors.

Together with writer Sven Böttcher, he co-authored the thrillers The Fifth Plane (2007) and Zero (2010), both of which became bestsellers. Bröckers and Böttcher published them under the pseudonym John S. Cooper, for which they invented and maintained over several years a biography as an American author who came to writing late in life.

In 2014, the first edition of the bestseller Wir sind die Guten, which he co-authored with Paul Schreyer, was published. The authors attempt to prove that geostrategic interests are the driving force behind the Russo-Ukrainian war and that regime change has been organized.

== Positions ==
=== 11 September 2001 ===
Bröckers is considered by Andreas Anton, along with Gerhard Wisnewski and Andreas von Bülow, as one of the most well-known and journalistically successful representatives of conspiracy theories on 11 September 2001 in the German-speaking world. With his "WTC Conspiracy" series at the online magazine Telepolis, Bröckers became known to a wider audience and achieved high circulation with his subsequent book Verschwörungen, Verschwörungstheorien und die Geheimnisse des 11.9. published by Zweitausendeins. In a 2002 Telepolis article, Bröckers referred to the account by Fox reporter Carl Cameron on FBI information about conversations possibly intercepted via Converse Infosys in the run-up to the attacks. This process, as well as the question Cui bono, nourished suspicions of a Kosher Conspiracy in connection with the terrorist attacks of 11 September. In Bröckers opinion, only George W. Bush and Ariel Sharon come into question as the main suspects of this attack, as they would have made the most use of it for their politics. Bröckers was sharply criticized for this contribution and accused of shoddy research due to the reproduction of outdated or false arguments. The Berlin historian Wolfgang Wippermann spoke of "anti-Semitism pure and simple", since Bröckers, with the question about the cui bono, Ariel Sharon, Israel and the Jews in general, which is just typical for conspiracy ideological thinking, declared them to be the main profiteers. The journalist Tobias Jaecker accused Bröckers of supporting anti-Semitic conspiracy theories in the wake of the Protocols of the Elders of Zion. In addition, Jaecker notes that Bröckers deals with the subject ironically and less doggedly than other representatives of conspiracy theories, "there you always don't know exactly: does he really believe that now or is he actually just making fun of it."

He first wrote on the matter in the 13 September 2001, edition of the online magazine Telepolis and subsequently published two books on 9/11: Verschwörungen, Verschwörungstheorien und die Geheimnisse des 11.9 which was, under the title 'Conspiracies, Conspiracy Theories and the Secrets of 9/11, the only book promoting a 9/11 conspiracy theories to be translated into English from German. Its sequel was entitled Fakten, Fälschungen und die unterdrückten Beweise des 11.9. (Facts, Forgeries and the Suppressed Evidence of 9/11).

Bröckers stated that the unanimous opinion expressed by the media that Bin Laden was responsible made him suspicious: "Although it was the biggest police investigation of all time... one year after the attacks the amount of evidence gathered against those who allegedly masterminded them, Osama Bin Laden and his terrorist group Al Qaeda, comes to no more than it did only a few hours afterwards: virtually nothing." Bröckers does not accept that Al Qaeda and Osama bin Laden planned and executed the 9/11 attacks.

Bröckers is a longstanding writer on conspiracy theories who was working on a book on conspiracy theories before the 9/11 attacks. As an admirer and translator of the work of novelist Robert Anton Wilson, co-author of The Illuminatus! Trilogy, Bröckers was working a book on a "new science of conspirology" in Sept. 2001, which led to his work on 9/11. His proposed scheme of thought would include "a general theory of conspiracy theories" as a guide to assessing their validity, instead of "blindly demonizing" them.

== Reception and criticism ==
In his dissertation on the history of conspiracy theories as a history of the media, media studies scholar John David Seidler devotes a separate section to Bröckers, in which he analyzes his statements on the media. According to this, he professes a conscious rejection of established media as the basis of journalistic research: he sees these as mere consensus machines and tending to corrupt. In contrast, Bröckers praises the Internet as an alternative to the "media conspiracy": "Googling Google twice a day and making up your own mind – that reliably helps against virulent manipulations, propaganda infections and impending chronic dumbing down!" By denigrating the mainstream media with medical metaphors, however, he exposed himself to suspicion of propaganda. Seidler explains the fierce attacks on his theses with the fact that Bröckers, unlike other conspiracy theorists, appears recognizably as a professional journalist and publishes in a thoroughly reputable environment.

In 2017, Bröckers judged in the online magazine Rubikon that the behavior of the CIA and the media against President Trump were clear indications of a "deep state" "which is conducting a coup from within by undemocratic means...". He called on the "serious left" to overcome the "cognitive dissonance" that compels them, for example, using the assassination of Kennedy as an example, to question what he sees as the improbability of Oswald's perpetration or to consider the official account of 9/11 indiscernible. These issues, he said, are not about "right" or "left," racism or Trump support, but simply about "preserving a democratic rule of law." Swiss journalist Roger Schawinski judges this to be a "clear indication that leading conspiracy theorists are trying to close ranks between left-wing extremism and right-wing extremism because they seem to agree on the central conspiracy theories."

=== Legalization of drugs, especially hemp ===
Bröckers is also a long-time activist and author advocating the legalization of hemp. In 1993 he co-authored the influential Die Wiederentdeckung der Nutzpflanze Hanf (The Rediscovery of the Agricultural Crop Hemp) with Jack Herer. His Albert Hofmann und die Entdeckung des LSD (the Discovery of LSD) was published in Jan. 2006. He has spoken at conferences promoting the use of LSD.

As far as they drug policy is concerned, states under the rule of law, according to Bröckers 1990, have reached the level of the medieval inquisition. He compares drug control to Michel Foucault's fabrication of madness for the establishment of the Enlightenment.

The increasing recourse to the methods of the Holy Inquisition in the current drug war, however, suggests that the suppression of drug users is as constitutive of the authority of industrialized states as the exclusion and confinement of the "insane" was of the rise to power of "reason."

He described the free choice of stimulants and intoxicants as human rights, the duty of states was accordingly "to guarantee the supply and to teach people the responsible use of these means". Bröckers called the state's measures against drug abuse counterproductive and, moreover, implausible in light of alcohol advertising, flat-rate drinking, and "coma drinking." The belief in the effectiveness of repressive drug policies was disproved (WHO 1971, UN study 1997, Paul Flynn's report to the Council of Europe 2002). The blame for drug deaths is not the drugs, but their prohibition. The "war on drugs" since the 1980s has been primarily about business; this war consumes budgets in the billions; the privatized U.S. prison industry makes more than one-third of its publicly traded revenues from drug criminals. World sales of illicit drugs represent the main source of revenue for organized crime and terrorism, he said. Prohibition is also desired in terms of foreign policy, since Pakistan, for example, would be ruined without the drug business. The solution would be a general ban on advertising for all drugs and the sale of heroin and cocaine in pharmacies. Bröckers attributes the demonization of the hemp plant to propaganda campaigns by Harry Anslinger in the United States, who declared the hemp plant a "killer weed" and, as head of the UN's drug agency, also brought cannabis into international disrepute. In 2018, he joined the call of the Bund Deutscher Kriminalbeamter for the legalization of cannabis and a "complete decriminalization of cannabis users."

The ban, according to BDK chairman André Schulz, was "historically arbitrary and to this day neither intelligent nor purposeful." Instead of criminal repression, which stigmatizes people and promotes criminal careers, there are better methods of drug policy that also ensure effective protection of children and young people.

Bröckers sees hemp as an important medicinal plant and an incomparable raw material for the construction industry, energy production and the textile industry.

== Prizes and awards ==
1985 Benno Martiny Medal for Clean Journalism in Bronze.

== Personal life ==
Bröckers has been married since 1981, has twins (born 1982) and lives in Berlin-Kreuzberg.
