= Telepolis =

German internet magazine

- Categories: Science, culture
- Founder: Armin Medosch; Florian Rötzer
- Founded: 1996
- Country: Germany
- Language: German
- Website: www.telepolis.de

Telepolis is a German Internet magazine, published by the Heinz Heise Verlag since the beginning of 1996.

It was founded by journalists Armin Medosch and Florian Rötzer and deals with privacy, science, culture, internet-related and general politics and media. Other contributors include Mathias Bröckers, Gabriele Hooffacker or Burkhard Schröder.

Telepolis received the European prize for online journalism in the category "investigative reporting" in 2000 for its coverage of the Echelon project; in 2002, it received the Online Grimme prize.

It periodically releases special issues, the first printed edition (January 2005) being on "Aliens - how researchers and space travellers want to uncover their presence." One of the articles in this edition, perhaps the most daring, described the so-called theory of everything (TOE) proposed by Burkhard Heim and its alleged applications to spacecraft propulsion. (Heim theory is not part of mainstream physics, and few physicists would describe it as a TOE.) Others deal with SETI and exobiology.

== Criticism ==
Telepolis presents contemporary historical topics differing from the so-called mainstream media. Two days after the Terror attacks on 11 September 2001, Mathias Bröckers speculated in an article on Telepolis that the Bush administration had deliberately allowed the attacks to happen. Over time, this one article became a conspiracy series that made Bröckers a star of the Truther scene and to him by Wolfgang Wippermann Antisemitism accusations.

In their 2017 essay "Lügenpresse - Eine Verschwörungstheorie?", Uwe Krüger and Jens Seiffert-Brockmann discuss counter-publics and alternative media that are anchored in various milieus and ideological orientations. During the Russo-Ukrainian War, they examined Telepolis, among others, and found that this medium emphasised information from a left-wing perspective that was negative towards the pro-Western actors and questioned the narrative of the democratic revolution. What such media have in common is "that they work on perforating the established media reality, questioning the established mass media definitions of reality, declaring reference frames and axioms of the mainstream invalid and exchanging them." The liberal, pluralistic democracy is portrayed as an opinion dictatorship based on a conspiracy between ruling elites and the established media.

In 2019, the Americanist and conspiracy theory researcher Michael Butter placed Telepolis among the alternative media such as KenFM, NachDenkSeiten or Rubikon, all of which would form an alternative public sphere to the traditional mass media and public broadcasting. According to Butter, they serve conspiracy theories such as that of the lying press and sell them as serious news.
