= Ant Street =

1995 film

- Directed by: Michael Glawogger
- Written by: Michael Glawogger; Barbara Zuber
- Starring: Robert Meyer
- Release date: 1995
- Running time: 87 minutes
- Country: Austria
- Language: German

Ant Street (German: Die Ameisenstraße) is a 1995 Austrian comedy film directed by Michael Glawogger. The film was selected as the Austrian entry for the Best Foreign Language Film at the 68th Academy Awards, but was not accepted as a nominee.

== Cast ==
- Robert Meyer as Alfred Navratil
- Bibiane Zeller as Frau Gerhartl
- Nikolaus Paryla as Roland Wanecek
- Monika Tajmar as Frau Elvira Wanecek
- Wolfgang Böck as Ernstl Freitag
- Brigitte Kren as Rosi Freitag

== See also ==
- List of submissions to the 68th Academy Awards for Best Foreign Language Film
- List of Austrian submissions for the Academy Award for Best Foreign Language Film
