= Walther von La Roche =

Walther von La Roche (29 February 1936 in Munich – 9 May 2010, Herrsching am Ammersee) was a German journalist, author and journalism teacher. Until 2006, he taught as Honorary Professor of Radio Journalism at the University of Leipzig.

== Life ==
Walther von La Roche already gained his first journalistic experience as a student. After graduation in 1954, he began studying law at the Ludwig-Maximilians-Universität München (LMU), which he completed with the Assessor exam. In 1956, he received a scholarship from the Werner Friedmann Institute in Munich, the precursor of Deutsche Journalistenschule. From 1961, he worked full-time at Bayerischer Rundfunk as an editor and presenter. Until 1985, Walther von La Roche was also responsible for radio and television training at Bayerischer Rundfunk.

La Roche has written numerous books and essays, including the standard work "Introduction to practical journalism", which first appeared in 1975 (today's editors: Klaus Meier and Gabriele Hooffacker). He was the founder and publisher of the book series Journalistische Praxis. From 2006, the series was published by Econ Verlag, since 2013 by Verlag Springer VS; Co-editor and publisher since 2010 is Gabriele Hooffacker.
