= Gabriele Hooffacker =

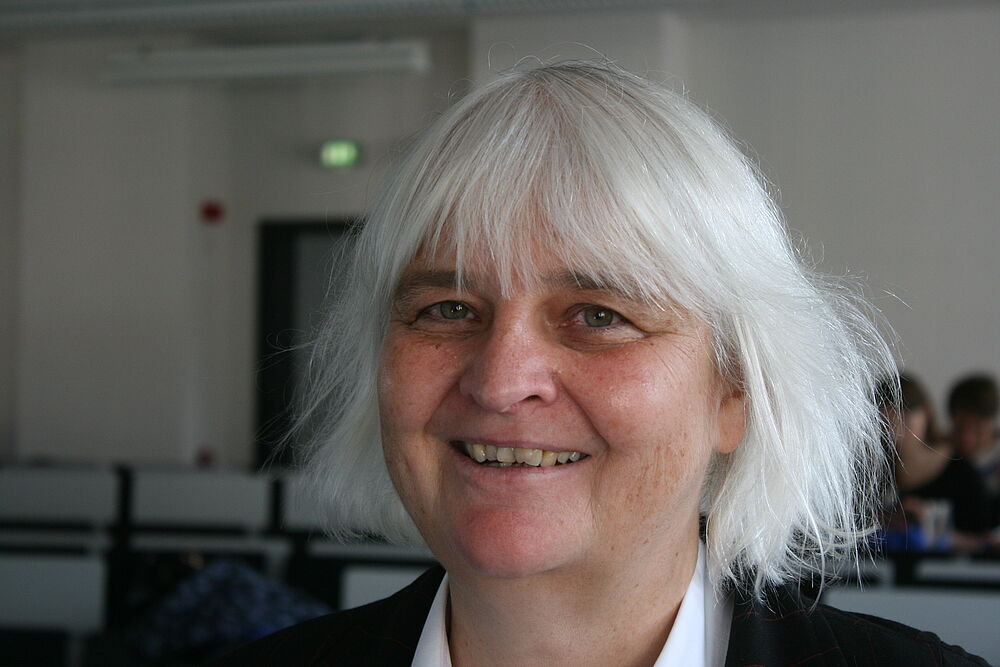
Hooffacker in 2017

Gabriele Hooffacker (born February 10, 1959) is a German journalist, journalism instructor and professor at Leipzig University of Applied Science. Her work and research focus on online media, interactive and participatory formats in journalism, and digital teaching and learning media. From 2017 to 2025, she organized the annual Long Night of Video Games at HTWK Leipzig. As of May 1, 2026, Gabriele Hooffacker assumed the role of scientific director of the European Institute for Journalism and Communication Research e. V. at the Sparkasse Leipzig Media Foundation.

She is the editor of the journalism series Journalistische Praxis. Together with Horst Pöttker and others, she has been editing the online journal Journalism Research / Journalistik – Zeitschrift für Journalismusforschung since 2018.

== Life ==
Gabriele Hooffacker studied Historical Sciences, German studies and economics at LMU Munich. Meanwhile, she was employee of Monumenta Germaniae Historica.

She has been dealing with the new media since the early eighties. In 1987, she founded CL-Net (later part of the APC), a computer-based grassroots organization for citizens who wanted to use the internet as a tool for political and cultural interaction. In 1988, she set up her own company, now called Foundation Journalists-Academy Dr. Hooffacker, which is a Journalism school and a consultancy on new media issues. Her works include several publications on online journalism, teaching journalism and the societal dimension of the internet.

Hooffacker writes for the online magazines onlinejournalismus.de, Telepolis and others. She deals primarily with the themes of teaching journalism, online journalism, Internet culture, Internet and right-wing radicalism. Hooffacker is member of the jury of “Alternativer Medienpreis”. She publishes the book series "Journalistische Praxis", which was founded by Walther von La Roche. In 2018, Gabriele Hooffacker is co-founder of the bilingual journalism journal "Journalistik" for journalism research.

== Publications (extract) ==
- (with Klaus Meier): La Roches Einführung in den praktischen Journalismus: Mit genauer Beschreibung aller Ausbildungswege Deutschland · Österreich · Schweiz, Springer VS, Wiesbaden 2026, ISBN 978-3-658-16657-1
- „I believe that journalism is in urgent need of change“. On the relationship between academic journalism training and journalistic practice. Journalism Research 2, 2025, 8. Jg., pp. 227-236
- Warum wir die Medien nicht verstehen – und sie uns nicht. Springer VS, Wiesbaden 2024, ISBN 978-3-658-44944-5
- Online journalism. Copywriting and conception for the internet. A handbook for training and practice. Palgrave Macmillan London / New York / Shanghai 2022, ISBN 978-3-658-35730-6
- Journalistic Practice: Constructive Journalism. How Media can Implement the Topic of Migration for Young People. Wiesbaden 2021, ISBN 978-3-658-33843-5
- Let’s talk about utopias. On the topicality of ecological visions and media critique in Ernest Callenbach’s novel Ecotopia. In: Journalism Research, Vol. 4 (3), 2021, pp. 221-230. DOI: 10.1453/2569-152X-32021-11804-en
- Copycats or integrative innovators?. A proposal for the assessment of »alternative media«. In: Journalism Research, Vol. 3 (3), 2020, pp. 235-246. doi:10.1453/2569-152X-32020-11000-en
- Online-Journalismus: Texten und Konzipieren für das Internet. Ein Handbuch für Ausbildung und Praxis. 5. Auflage, Springer VS, Wiesbaden 2020, Reihe: Journalistische Praxis, ISBN 978-3-658-10771-0
- (with Wolfgang Kenntemich and Uwe Kulisch): Die neue Öffentlichkeit. Springer VS, Wiesbaden (3 Bände) 2018, 2024, 2026 ISBN 978-3-658-20808-0
- (with Cornelia Wolf): Technische Innovationen – Medieninnovationen? Herausforderungen für Kommunikatoren, Konzepte und Nutzerforschung. Springer VS, Wiesbaden 2016, ISBN 9783658149536
- Gabriele Hooffacker / Peter Lokk: Pressearbeit praktisch. Ein Handbuch für Ausbildung und Praxis, Journalistische Praxis, 1. Auflage Berlin 2011, ISBN 978-3-430-20119-3
- Gabriele Hooffacker (ed.): Journalismus lehren, München 2010, ISBN 978-3-9805604-6-7
- Gabriele Hooffacker: Online-Journalismus. Online-Journalismus. Schreiben und Konzipieren für das Internet. Ein Handbuch für Ausbildung und Praxis, Journalistische Praxis, 1. Aufl. München 2001, 4. Auf. Springer VS, Wiesbaden 2015, ISBN 978-3-658-10771-0
- Gabriele Hooffacker: Wir nutzen Netze. Ein kommunikatives Manifest, Steidl Verlag, Göttingen 1995, ISBN 3-88243-379-5
- Gabriele Hooffacker: Avaritia radix omnium malorum (Mikrokosmos 19), Peter Lang Verlag, Frankfurt am Main 1986, ISBN 3-8204-8832-4
