= Patrick Reynolds (activist) =

American activist and actor (born 1948)

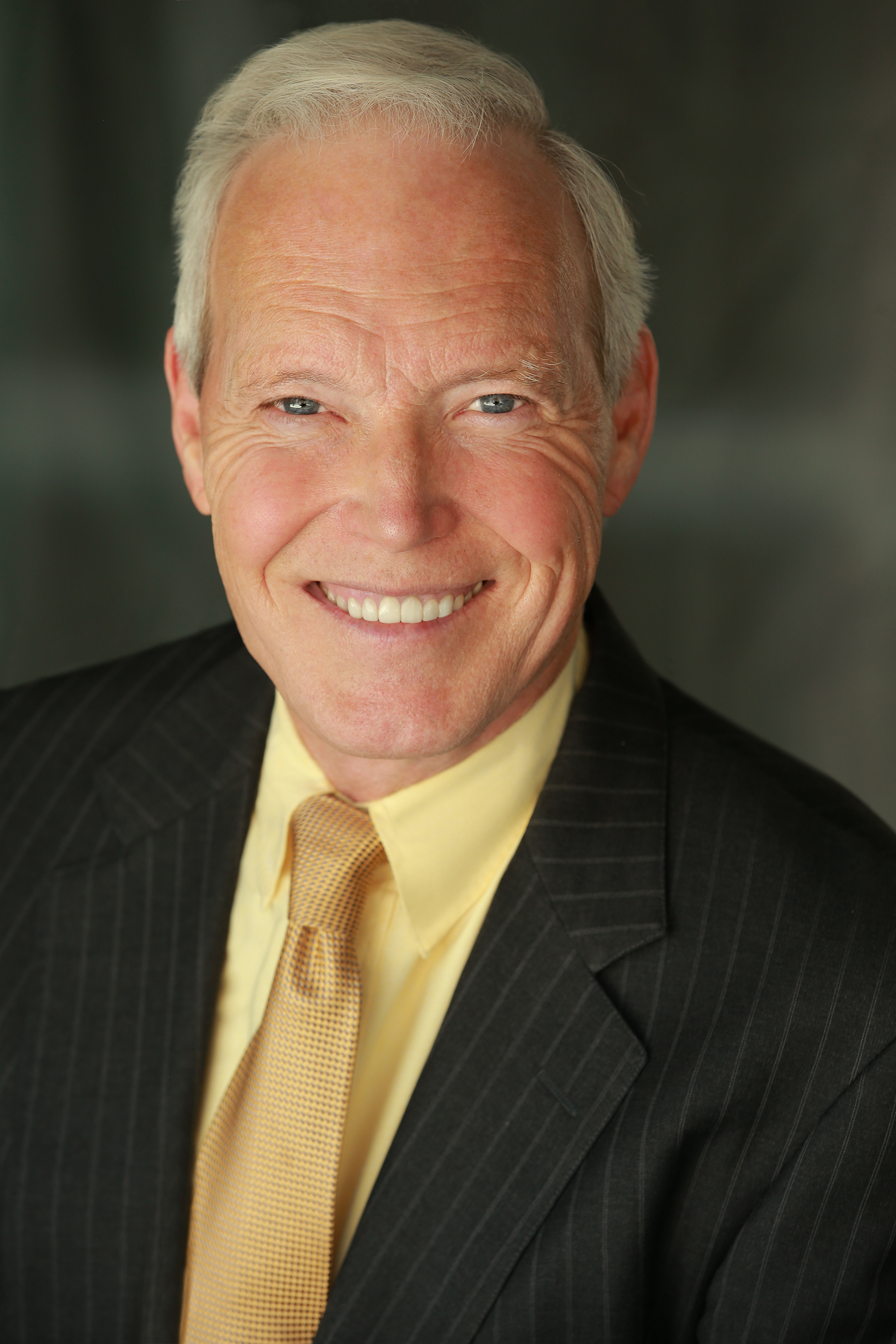
- Reynolds in 2020
- Born: December 2, 1948 (age 77); Miami Beach, Florida, U.S.
- Occupations: Actor; activist
- Years active: 1977–1992
- Spouse(s): Regine Wajesus -1985); Alexandra Reynolds (2007–present) (1 child)

Patrick Cleveland Reynolds (born December 2, 1948) is an American anti-smoking activist and former actor.

Born in Miami Beach, Florida, he is the grandson of the tobacco company founder, R. J. Reynolds, and speaks of how he believes his family business has killed millions, including his father, R. J. Reynolds Jr., and half brother, R. J. Reynolds III. He is a frequent speaker on the dangers of smoking, and founded a non-profit organization dedicated to anti-tobacco campaigning.

== Social activism ==
I consider myself the white sheep of my family

— Reynolds, 1986

In April 1986, Reynolds went with a friend to a meeting with U.S. Sen. Robert Packwood, where the issue of a proposed cut in tobacco tax was raised. Outraged, Reynolds stood up and asked why U.S. tobacco taxes were so low. By June 1986, Reynolds had become an anti-smoking activist, appearing in adverts for the American Lung Association and testifying before a congressional subcommittee at the invitation of Packwood, to the dismay of his family. He had already sold his tobacco stock in 1979, and from 1983 to 1985 tried to get hired by RJR Nabisco Inc. in an attempt to get the company to divest its tobacco holdings. Reynolds was a smoker for 17 years until 1985, when he quit after more than 10 years of trying. He has appeared on many national television programs.

In 1989, Reynolds founded The Foundation for a Smokefree America. That same year, Reynolds published The Gilded Leaf with Thomas Shachtman, chronicling three generations of his family and its tobacco business, a book he had been working on since 1980. The book was re-issued in 2006 (ISBN 0-595-83831-6). In 2007 he released an educational video on DVD of a tobacco prevention talk he gave titled The Truth About Tobacco.

Former Surgeon General C. Everett Koop M.D., called him "one of the nation's most influential advocates of a smokefree America." He continues to speak on tobacco control to adult groups, and also gives motivational prevention talks before high school and elementary school audiences. He advised the Greek government on anti-smoking measures in 2009, and in 2011 was seeking sponsorship for a world tour.

In 2011, Reynolds said friction with his family had eased. "[S]ince 1986, the price of the stock kept going up. And as far as being an embarrassment, I received an award from the World Health Organization; I brought honor to the Reynolds family."

== Personal life ==
His mother was his father's second wife Marianne O'Brien, an actress who appeared in films in the 1940s such as The Very Thought of You and was contracted to Jack L. Warner. His parents separated when he was 3 and he did not meet his father again until he was 9. His father died in 1964 of emphysema at age 58, leaving a will that disinherited Patrick, his brother, and four half-brothers. Reynolds, however, received $500,000 from his father's fourth wife after agreeing not to contest the will. He also inherited $2.5 million from his grandfather in 1969 when he was 21.

After attending The Hotchkiss School, Reynolds studied filmmaking at the University of California and the University of Southern California. He ventured into acting in 1975 during a visit to the set of the film Nashville. His live-in girlfriend, actress Shelley Duvall, had invited him to the set, and director Robert Altman cast him in a small non-speaking role. Reynolds subsequently studied acting at several Los Angeles schools; with Milton Katselas, and classmates included Michelle Pfeiffer and Patrick Swayze. At the urging of his voice coach, he recorded three unreleased pop singles in 1982. He married his first wife Regina Wahl in Ofterschwang, West Germany, in July 1983, quit acting and briefly began working for her father's international bus company. He returned to acting after being offered a lead role in Eliminators. His mother died in 1985. In 1986, he spoke out publicly for the first time against the tobacco industry. He remarried in 2007, and lives in Los Angeles with his wife Alexandra and their son, born in October 2009.

== Filmography ==
Title	Year	Role	Notes	Ref.
Nashville	1975	Grand Ole Opry Performer	Uncredited, Feature Film Debut	
Buffalo Bill and the Indians	1976	President Cleveland's Aide	Uncredited	
Bernice Bobs Her Hair	1976	Draycott Deyo	Television Film	
The Tony Randall Show	1976	Bullet Head	1 episode	
Operation Petticoat	1977-1978	Bowles, Ensign on Admiral Tostin's Staff	2 episodes	
The Greatest Battle	1978	O'Hara's Aide		
The Eddie Capra Mysteries	1978	Wilmer	1 episode	
Hair	1979	Dancer	Uncredited	
Airplane!	1980	Third Krishna	Uncredited	
Xanadu	1980	Dancer	Uncredited	
A Rose for Emily	1983	Photographer	Television Short	
Eliminators	1986	Mandroid		
Civil Wars	1991-1992	Jarrod Harrison, Pro-Lifer #2	2 episodes	
