= Journalism Research =

Journalism Research (German: Journalistik – Zeitschrift für Journalismusforschung) is the only German-language academic journal dedicated to journalism research and the study of journalism and that is published bilingually, in German and English.

It was founded in 2018 by German journalism professor Horst Pöttker, together with four colleagues (Bernhard Debatin, Petra Herczeg, Gabriele Hooffacker, and Tanjev Schultz), and is published three times a year by the Herbert von Halem Publishing House (Cologne) as an open-access publication.

Each issue features several research articles, essays, commentaries for debate, and book reviews. The journal’s primary focus is journalism research, encompassing topics such as theories of journalism and journalistic practice, the history of journalism, and research into news media content and news media use.

As early as 1979, a German-language publication series also titled Journalistik existed. It was edited by Heinz Pürer and the Board of Trustees for Journalistic Education [Kuratorium für Journalistenausbildung] (now the Austrian Media Academy) until approximately 2006.

== Editors, editorial staff, and authors ==
Journalism Research is overseen by an editorial board. Current members include Horst Pöttker, Gabriele Hooffacker, Tanjev Schultz, Martina Thiele, Stine Eckert, Mandy Tröger, and Gunter Reus. Anna Berneiser serves as associate editor for Journalism Research and, in coordination with the editorial board, selects the books to be reviewed.

The authors include, among others, Roger Blum, Marcus Bölz, Carsten Brosda, Veronica Câmpian, Beatrice Dernbach, Lutz Frühbrodt, Hektor Haarkötter, Olha Harmatiy, Friederike Herrmann, Walter Hömberg, Joy Jenkins, Sahar Khamis, Uwe Krüger, Jessica Kunert, Wolfgang Langenbucher, Volker Lilienthal, Klaus Meier, Ingo von Münch, Klaus Ott, Marlis Prinzing, Jennifer Proffitt, Sigrun Rottmann, Sabine Schiffer, Katja Schmidt, Kenneth Starck, Tanja Thomas, Siegfried Weischenberg, Peter Welchering, and Cornelia Wolf.
