= Piper Verlag =

German publisher

- Industry: Publishing
- Founded: 1904; 122 years ago
- Defunct: Reinhard Piper
- Headquarters: Munich, Germany
- Key people: Felicitas von Lovenberg (CEO)
- Parent: Bonnier AB
- Website: https://www.piper.de/

Piper Verlag is a German publisher based in Munich, printing both fiction and non-fiction works. It currently prints over 200 new paperback titles per year. Authors published by the company include Andreas von Bülow and Sara Paretsky. It is owned by the Swedish media conglomerate Bonnier. It was founded in 1904 by 24-year-old Reinhard Piper (1879–1953).

== History ==
The founder of the publishing house, and the man who gave the company its name, was Reinhard Piper (born 31 October 1879 in Penzlin; died 18 October 1953 in Munich). Together with Georg Müller, he founded the Piper Verlag on 19 May 1904 in Munich. Only 24 years old at the founding of the publishing house, Reinhard Piper said about himself that he was "a young man with intellectual interests, a little bit of ingenuity, and very little money. However, I did possess the irrefutable drive to share with others what I believed in."

The long poem Dafnis by Arno Holz became the first book published by Piper in 1904. Relatively early in its history, the publishing house took on ambitious projects, such as an edition of the works of Arthur Schopenhauer and Dostoyevsky.

In the early 1990s, the program of the publishing company expanded continuously, but unfortunately without major successes. This situation led Klaus Piper to look for a parent company. On 1 January 1990 the Swedish Bonnier group became the owner of Piper Verlag. At the same time, Viktor Niemann took over the leadership of Piper's management.

Felicitas von Lovenberg, a German journalist, literary critic, and author, leads the publishing house since the spring of 2016.

== Authors ==
- Hannah Arendt
- Margaret Atwood
- Ingeborg Bachmann
- Lothar-Günther Buchheim
- Hape Kerkeling
- Hans Küng
- Juliane Koepcke
- Sándor Márai
- Reinhold Messner
- Michael Moore
- Sten Nadolny
- Sara Paretsky
- Ann Patchett
- Charlotte Roche
- Jochen Schmidt
- Heinrich Steinfest
- Paul Watzlawick
