= Howard V. Perlmutter =

Howard V. Perlmutter (4 November 1925 – 8 November 2011) was an expert on Globalization and Internationalization of Companies. He specialized in the development of international enterprises.

Perlmutter became famous for his 1969 publication of the so-called EPG Model, which he expanded in 1979 together with his colleague David A. Heenan to become the EPRG-Model. The model's name is an acronym based on the names of the three basic international mindsets of managers described in the model (Ethnocentrism, Polycentrism, Geocentrism) and later also Regiocentrism. The model is still basic in international management and international HR management.
