= EPG model =

Business model

EPG Model is an international business model including three dimensions – ethnocentric, polycentric and geocentric. It has been introduced by Howard V. Perlmutter within the journal article "The Tortuous Evolution of Multinational Enterprises" in 1969. These three dimensions allow executives to more accurately develop their firm's general strategic profile.

== Overview ==
The epg is a framework for a firm to better pinpoint its strategic profile in terms of international business strategy. The authors Wind, Douglas and Perlmutter have later extended the model by a fourth dimension, "Regiocentric", creating the "EPRG Model".

The importance of the EPG model is mainly in the firm's awareness and understanding of its specific focus. Because a strategy based mainly on one of the three elements can mean significantly different costs or benefits to the firm, it is necessary for a firm to carefully analyze how their firm is oriented and make appropriate decisions moving forward. In performing an EPG analysis, a firm may discover that they are oriented in a direction that is not beneficial to the firm or misaligned with the firm's corporate culture and generic strategy. In this case, it would be important for a firm to re-align its focus in order to ensure that it is correctly representing the firm's focus.

Each of the three elements of the EPG profile is briefly highlighted in the table below, showing the main focus for each element, as well as its correlating function, products, and geography.

	Ethnocentrism	Polycentrism	Geocentrism
Definition	Based on preference for employees from the company's home country	Based on preference for host country nationals (HCN)	Based on preference for those best suited to the job wherever they are from.
Strategic Orientation/Focus	Home Country Oriented	Host Country Oriented	Global Oriented
Function	Finance	Marketing	R&D
Product	Industrial products	Consumer goods	–
Geography	Developing countries	–	US and Europe

== Elements of the EPG model ==
=== Ethnocentrism ===
There is no international firm today whose executives will say that ethnocentrism is absent in their organization. The word ethnocentrism derives from the Greek word "ethnos", meaning "nation" or "people," and the English word center or centrism. A common phrase set for ethnocentrism is "tunnel vision". In this context, ethnocentrism is the view that a particular ethnic group's system of beliefs and values is morally superior to all others. Ethnocentrism is characterized by or based on the attitude that one's own group is superior to others. The ethnocentric attitude is found in many companies that have many nationalities and culture groups working together. It is a natural tendency for people to act ethnocentrically because it is what they feel comfortable with. It is based on past experiences and learned behaviors and norms.

The ethnocentric attitude is seen often when home nationals of various countries believe they are superior to, more trustworthy and more reliable than their foreign counterparts. Ethnocentric attitudes are often expressed in determining the managerial process at home and overseas. There is a tendency towards ethnocentrism in relations with subsidiaries in developing countries and in industrial product divisions.

Organizations that are designed with an ethnocentric focus will portray certain tendencies. These include an organizations headquarters that's decision-making authority is relatively high. Home standards are applied to the evaluation and control of the organization. These standards are to ensure performance and product quality. Ethnocentric attitudes can be seen in the organizations communication process. This is evident when there is constant advice, and counsel from the headquarters to the subsidiary. This advice usually bears the message, "This works at home; therefore it must work in your country". Organizations that portray ethnocentrism usually identify themselves with the nationality of the owner. For example, Wal-Mart is seen as an American company because its headquarters are located in America. The crucial critical concept of ethnocentrism in international organizations is the current policy that recruits from the home country are hired, and trained for key executive position in the organization. The ethnocentric attitude is a centralized approach. With the centralized approach, the training originates at the headquarters and then corporate trainers travel to the subsidiaries, and often adapt to local situations.

There are many costs that ethnocentrism can incur on an international organization. Using the centralized approach can cause inefficient staffing problems in the organization, this is because the employed staff will incur high financial costs to the global business as they have to pay for the transfer costs of the staff coming from the home country to overseas. This also could bring inefficiency to the business if the new staff is not able to fit in and be culturally compatible in their newly situated location. There is often ineffective planning due to poor feedback from the international subsidiaries. The organization may see capital flight, as the best men in the foreign subsidiary will seek other employment opportunities. Ethnocentric organizations may lose their ability to build a high caliber local organization, which could lead to fewer innovations. This in turn could cause a lack of flexibility and local responsiveness.

==== Costs and benefits of esm ====
Costs	Benefits
Ineffective planning due to poor feedback	Simple organization
Subsidiary 'valuable' executive flight	Greater communication and control
Fewer innovations	
Inability to build a high caliber local org.	
Lack of flexibility and responsiveness	

=== Polycentrism ===
Polycentrism is one of the three legs in the EPG framework that "identifies one of the attitudes or orientations toward internationalization that is associated with successive stages in the evolution of international operations"

Polycentrism can be defined as a host country orientation; which reflects host countries goals and objectives with respect "to different management strategies and planning procedures with regard to international operations." Under a polycentric perspective, a company's management team believes that in international business practices local preferences and techniques are usually found most appropriate to deal with the local market conditions. In the most extreme views of polycentrism, it is the "attitude that culture of various countries are different, that foreigners are difficult to understand and should be left alone as long as their work is profitable."

Although there is great benefit to taking into consideration local preferences in the host country when it comes to international business practices, a polycentric approach has its obstacles once implemented. A polycentric approach "gives rise to the problems of coordination and control." Management usually loses coordination of its international subsidiaries usually because they are forced to operate independently of one another, and establish separate objectives and plans which meet the host countries criteria. "Marketing of the company's products are organized on a country-by-country basis, and marketing research is conducted independently in each country."

Management is unable to have total control over the company in the host country because it is found that "local nationals have a better understanding and awareness of national market conditions, more so than home office personnel." This is very accurate in several aspects of the products delivery including pricing, customer service and well-being, market research, and channels of distribution. Therefore, the majority of control in the host countries practices is lost, and the company is forced to manage its operations from the outside. "Local nationals occupy virtually all of the key positions in their respective local subsidiaries, and they appoint and develop their own people."

There are a few other drawbacks to the polycentric approach which may restrict a multinational company from completely realizing its full potential in the host country. The first drawback of a polycentric approach is that the "benefits of global coordination between subsidiaries such as the development of economies of scale cannot be realized." This basically restricts the company for mass production of its products, as they are forced to manufacture its products with the local preferences being the priority of production. Secondly, the fact that because all of the subsidiaries work independently of one another, learning across geographic regions is not applied to one another. Therefore, knowledge that could be beneficial across all regions is lost, and subsidiaries could be worse off than if they had obtained the knowledge. Lastly is that the "treating of each market as unique may lead to the duplication of facilities." By focusing on the business practices of local preferences and techniques which pertain to the local market conditions, the subsidiary in the host country could mimic that of local companies and appear less appealing to local consumers.

A polycentric approach should only be used within a company in which there is a certain amount of comfort in allowing the host country to make all major decisions, following their own procedures and objectives. It must be understood that there is limited control or communication between the home and host-country, and products and distribution may vary across countries. Companies should evaluate all legs of the EPG model before implementing a strategy, as all companies differ in international strategy among industry and region.

==== Costs and benefits of polycentrism ====
Costs	Benefits
Waste due to duplication	Intense exploitation of local markets
Localization costs of "universal" products	Better sales due to better-informed local management
Inefficient use of home-country experience	More initiative for local products
Excessive regard for local traditions at expense of global growth	More host government support
	Good local managers with high morale

=== Geocentrism ===
The third and last aspect of the EPG model is the geocentric portion, this notion focuses on a more world-orientated approach to multinational management. The main difference of geocentrism compared to ethno- and polycentrism is that it does not show a bias to either home or host country preferences but rather spotlights the significance of doing whatever it takes to better serve the organization. This is evident in the sense that upper management does not hire or delegate responsibility to an individual because they best exemplify the host or home countries opinions. Instead, management selects the person best suited to foster the companies goals and solve problems worldwide. The purpose of this is to build an organization in which the subsidiary is not only a good citizen of the host nation but is a leading exporter from this nation in the international community and contributes such benefits as (1) an increasing supply of hard currency, (2) new skills and, (3) a knowledge of advanced technology.

The sole goal of geocentrism is to globally unite both headquarters and subsidiaries. The firm's subsidiaries are thus neither satellites nor independent city states, but parts of a whole whose focus is on worldwide objectives as well as local objectives, each part making its unique contribution with its unique competence. Furthermore, geocentrism boils down to product differentiation, diversifying functions in the sense that different markets require dissimilar behavior, and lastly geographic location. Out of all aspects of a business there are two that are predominantly geocentric – research and development and marketing. As stated previously this is because different markets, regions, and countries require distinctive ways of approaching them. For example, the standards in which the home country operates are going to be much different from how the host country operates. What is accepted as a permissible way of treating employees in the United States, the home country, may not be acceptable to Chinese employees, in the host country. In addition, consumer tastes vary greatly from home country to host country, and going even further these tastes will continue to change from host country to host country proving that for R&D to be effective it must be world-oriented.

It is the overall goal of geocentrism to form a collaborative network between headquarters and subsidiaries; this arrangement should entail a set of universal standards that can thus be used as a guideline when attacking key business decisions. Such decisions include the management and start-up of new plants, ideas of how to market a product to a new consumer base, and product alterations. The most effective way to enforce geocentrism is with a formal reward system that encourages both subsidiary and headquarters managers to work for global goals rather than just defending home country values. This ideology is an example of how today's business must manage both global and local issues in order to succeed in the end.

While there are many obstacles that will hinder a company's ability to become geocentric, there are also a handful of forces which will drive them towards this. For instance, there is the loss of national sovereignty when one nation is dominated by another – this can lead to a loss in economic and political nationalism. There is also the feeling from host countries that receive disproportionate reimbursement from international profits that only fuels the lack of trust toward big corporations felt by political leaders of host countries. On the other hand, there are also forces that push an organization to the geocentric notion of managing a multinational corporation (MNC). The first and most obvious of these is competition, if one company is to enter a new country or market it forces rivals to do the same in order to maintain pace. Secondly, there is a large number of customers available to MNC's internationally that require a geocentric approach in order to be effectively targeted. A third force causing this movement is the abundance of growing world markets, occurring in areas such as income earning age population, rising GDP's, and escalating disposable income in areas such as China and Korea.

With that said, geocentrism is an ideology that must be accepted by any corporation operating globally in order for any sort of success and long term stability to be attained. However, there are certain aspects of the business life in which ethnocentrism and polycentrism are more adequate models to follow, but functional smoothness and success in both home and host countries is dependent upon upper managements ability to select individuals who are world orientated as opposed to home or host country centered.

==== Costs and benefits of geocentrism ====
Costs	Benefits
High communication and travel costs	Integrated global outlook
Educational costs at all levels	More powerful total company throughout
Time spent in consensus decision-making	Better quality of products and services
International headquarters bureaucracy	Worldwide use of best resources
"Too wide" distribution of power	Improved local country management
Personnel problems, especially those of international executive reentry	Greater commitment to global objectives
	Higher global profits

== See also ==
- Ethnocentrism
- Polycentrism
- Geocentric
