= RIXC =

Latvian arts centre

RIXC logo

RIXC Center for New Media Culture is an arts organization based in Riga, Latvia. It was created in 2000, developing out of the E-LAB originally founded by Rasa and Raitis Šmiti.

RIXC hosts an annual Festival of Arts and Sciences in Riga. This festival was first run by the E-LAB in 1996, and went by the name "Art+Communication" until 2015.

In 2001, RIXC collaborated with the Ventspils International Radio Astronomy Centre (VIRAC) to explore creative artistic uses of a radio telescope nicknamed "Little Star" which had been abandoned by the retreating Soviet Army in 1993.
