= Uwe Krüger =

- Born: October 11, 1964
- Occupations: Businessman, physicist
- Known for: CEO of WS Atkins plc (2011–2017)

Uwe Krüger (also spelled Krueger, born 11 October 1964) is a Swiss-German businessman and physicist. Krueger serves as Head of the Industrials, Business Services and Energy & Resources Investment Group, as well as the Head of the Portfolio Management Group at Temasek International in Singapore. He holds the position of Senior Managing Director at Temasek. Temasek is a leading globally diversified investment company headquartered in Singapore with a net portfolio of $275 billion. From June 2011 to July 2017 he was CEO of WS Atkins plc. The company was acquired by SNC-Lavalin and delisted from the London Stock Exchange effective July 2017.

Krüger is a member of the Executive Advisory Board of the World.Minds Foundation, where he contributes expertise in global investment, science, and corporate leadership.

== Personal life ==
He lives in Switzerland. His wife, Dr. med. Daniela Greiner-Kruger, is a Medical Doctor (Dermatology). He became a Fellow of the Royal Academy of Engineering in 2017.

== See also ==
- Association for Consultancy and Engineering

Business positions
Preceded by Keith Clarke	Chief Executive of WS Atkins plc August 2011 – July 2017	Succeeded by Company taken over
