= Andreas von Bülow =

German politician

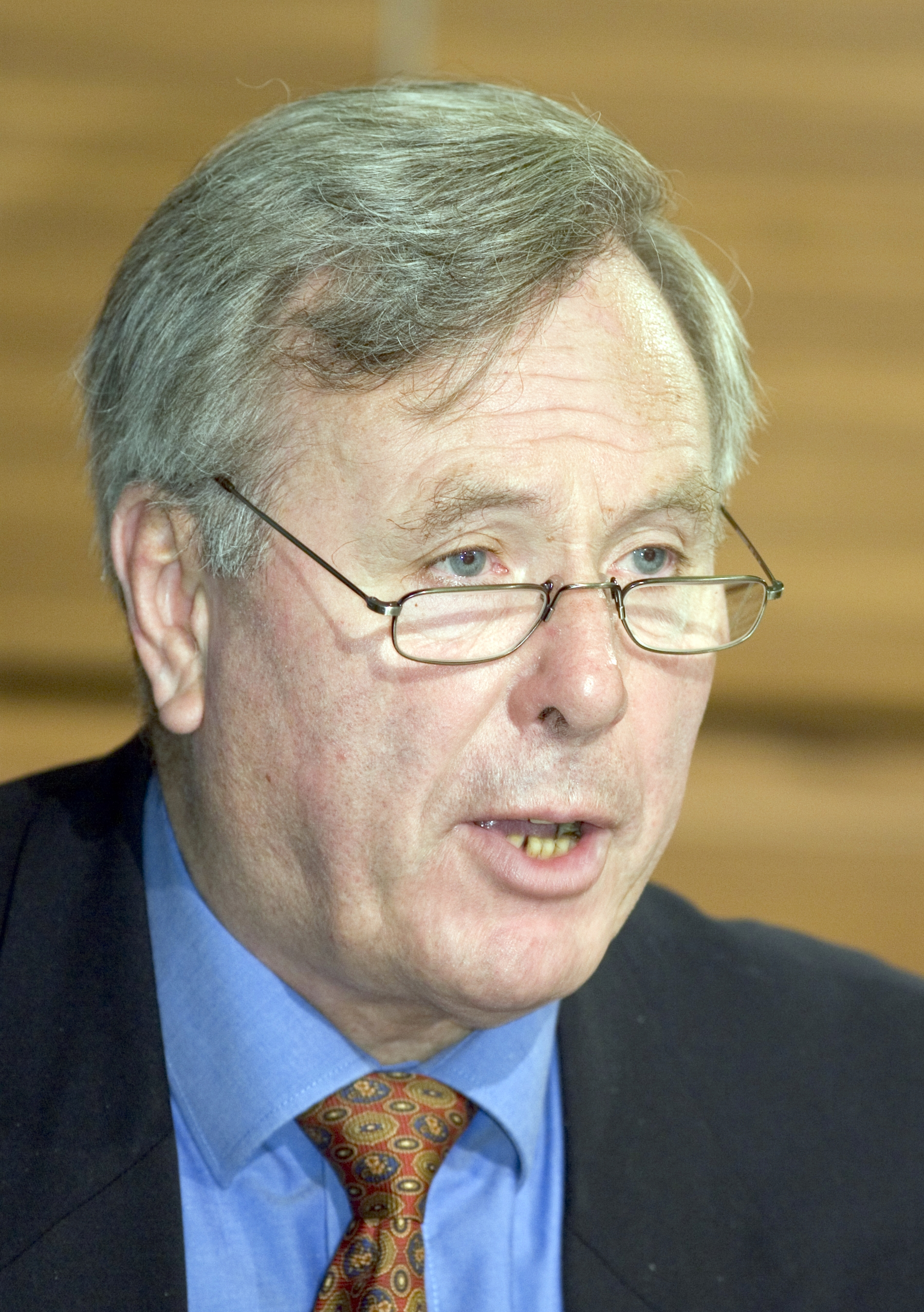
- Bülow at the 2005 Axis for Peace conference

Minister for Research and Technology
- In office 6 November 1980 – 1 October 1982
- Chancellor: Helmut Schmidt
- Preceded by: Volker Hauff
- Succeeded by: Heinz Riesenhuber

Parliamentary State Secretary in the Ministry of Defence
- In office 16 December 1976 – 6 November 1980
- Chancellor: Helmut Schmidt
- Minister: Georg Leber; Hans Apel
- Preceded by: Hermann Schmidt
- Succeeded by: Willfried Penner

Member of the Bundestag for Baden-Württemberg
- In office 20 October 1969 – 10 November 1994
- Preceded by: multi-member district
- Succeeded by: multi-member district

Personal details
- Born: 17 June 1937 (age 89) Dresden, Saxony, Nazi Germany (now Germany)
- Party: Social Democratic Party (1960–)
- Education: Heidelberg University
- Occupation: Politician; civil servant; lawyer; author
- Known for: The CIA and 11 September

Andreas von Bülow (born 17 July 1937) is a German politician of the Social Democratic Party (SPD) and writer. He was Minister for Research and Technology from 1980 to 1982. Von Bülow has authored books about intelligence agencies, including In the Name of the State. CIA, BND and the criminal machinations of secret services. (German: Im Namen des Staates. CIA, BND und die kriminellen Machenschaften der Geheimdienste.) and The CIA and 11 September (Die CIA und der 11. September). He holds a doctorate degree in Jurisprudence.

== Political career ==
Bülow, a member of the Bülow family, served as secretary of state in the German Federal Ministry of Defence (1976–1980) and Minister for Research and Technology (1980–1982), both during the Chancellor Helmut Schmidt administration, and was regarded as a "rising star" of German politics at the time. He served for 25 years as an SPD member of the German parliament (1969–1994). In the late eighties and early nineties, he served on the parliamentary committee on intelligence services ("Parlamentarischer Kontrollausschuss"). This committee supervises German intelligence agencies and has access to classified information. In the early nineties, Bülow also served as SPD ranking member of the Schalck-Golodkowski investigation committee, a task that first led him to inquire into white collar crime in connection with Eastern intelligence services, and later also into what he labels "criminal activities" of Western intelligence services. His first major publication dealing with this realm, In the Name of the State (German: Im Namen des Staates) is a heavily referenced and extensive study focusing mostly on the CIA. Since leaving the Bundestag, he has largely left the SPD's political loop.

== 9/11 ==
Bülow wrote a book called The CIA and 11 September (German: Die CIA und der 11. September), in which he implies US government complicity in the September 11, 2001 attacks.

Planning the attacks was a master deed, in technical and organizational terms. To hijack four big airliners within a few minutes and fly them into targets within a single hour and doing so on complicated flight routes! That is unthinkable, without backing from the secret apparatuses of state and industry. Tagesspiegel, 13. Jan. 2002

At his home in Bonn, he told an interviewer for The Daily Telegraph : "If what I say is right, the whole US government should end up behind bars" and '"They have hidden behind a veil of secrecy and destroyed the evidence – that they invented the story of 19 Muslims working within Osama bin Laden's al-Qa'eda – in order to hide the truth of their own covert operation." .

== Affiliations ==
He is a member of:

- Scholars for 9/11 Truth and Justice.
- Axis for Peace Conference.
