= Oliver Schröm =

German journalist

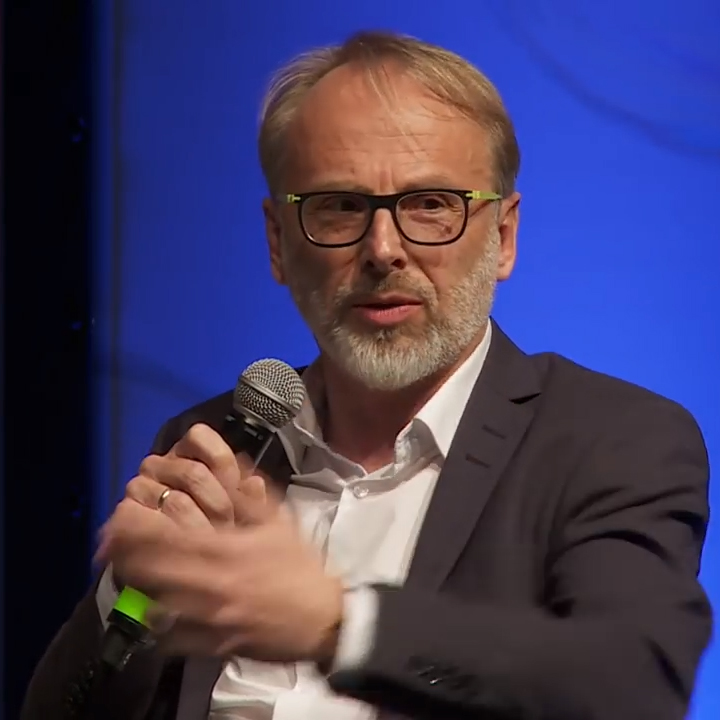
- Schröm in 2018
- Born: 1964 (age 60–61); Heidenheim an der Brenz, Baden-Württemberg, Germany
- Occupation: Journalist

Oliver Schröm (born 1964) is one of Germany's acknowledged investigative journalists. He is the founder and head of the Investigative Reporting Team at the Stern magazine. Since November 2011 he is the chairman of the German association of investigative journalists, Netzwerk Recherche.

== Career ==
During his career as an investigative reporter Schröm has worked on several scoops and investigative stories.

In 1995 he revealed the Nazi-connections of the Austrian right-wing politician Jörg Haider and thus ruined his chances to become vice-chancellor. In 2000 Schröm published a book on the donation practices used by the conservative party CDU that shook the political landscape in Germany and triggered an enquiry into the subject. Two years later Schröm published a standard book about the terrorist Carlos, the jackal, the year after that he uncovered the deadly mistakes of the security agencies before 9/11 in a series of articles and in two books.

Schröm has worked at stern magazine since 2007 where he published a series of articles on German politicians and security agencies and their involvement in America's war on terror. Together with a colleague he revealed that German authorities were aware of the innocence of German born Murat Kurnaz but let him stay in Guantanamo for four more years. 2009 he contributed to the report "Iran could ignite a nuclear weapon in six months" that gained much attention in international media. In summer 2010 he interviewed Heinrich Kieber who had stolen a Liechtenstein bank's client database and sold it to international tax authorities. Kieber is wanted by Interpol and lives in hiding. Between fall 2010 and sommer 2011 he uncovered with colleagues the criminals behind the international football match-fixing in a series of articles. 2012 his investigative team researched one of the biggest scandals in the last 10 years in Germany which is named as NSU case in Germany. In 2013 he revealed with his team a network of private companies in Germany that act as henchmen for U.S. intelligence services and the mafia connection of Germany's most prominent rap star Bushido.

== Books ==
- Das Geheimnis der Ritter vom Heiligen Grabe. Die Fünfte Kolonne des Vatikans (together with Egmont R. Koch). Hoffmann und Campe, Hamburg 1995, ISBN 978-3-4551-1064-7
- Allein gegen Kohl, Kiep & Co. (together with John Goetz, Conny Neumann), Links, Berlin 2000, ISBN 978-3861532170
- Stille Hilfe für braune Kameraden. Das geheime Netzwerk der Alt- und Neonazis (together with Andrea Röpke). Links, Berlin 2002, ISBN 978-3861532316
- Im Schatten des Schakals. Carlos und die Wegbereiter des internationalen Terrorismus. Aufbau, Berlin 2002, ISBN 3-7466-8119-7.
- Al Qaida. Akteure, Strukturen, Attentate. Links, Berlin 2003, ISBN 3-86153-285-9.
- Tödliche Fehler. Das Versagen von Politik und Geheimdiensten im Umfeld des 11. September (together with Dirk Laabs) Aufbau, Berlin 2003, ISBN 978-3351025649
- Gefährliche Mission. Die Geschichte des erfolgreichsten deutschen Terrorfahnders. Fischer, Frankfurt am Main 2005, ISBN 978-3-596-16370-0.
- Schröm, Oliver; Schenck, Niklas (2017). Die Krebsmafia: kriminelle Milliardengeschäfte und das skrupellose Spiel mit dem Leben von Patienten (Originalausgabe ed.). Köln: Lübbe. ISBN 978-3-7325-4946-7.
- Schröm, Oliver (2021). Die Cum-Ex-Files: der Raubzug der Banker, Anwälte und Superreichen - und wie ich ihnen auf die Spur kam. Berlin: Ch. Links Verlag. ISBN 978-3-96289-123-7.
- Schröm, Oliver; Hollenstein, Oliver (2022). Die Akte Scholz: der Kanzler, das Geld und die Macht (2., durchgesehene Auflage ed.). Berlin: Ch. Links Verlag. ISBN 978-3-96289-177-0.
