= 9/11 truth movement =

Group of loosely affiliated 9/11 conspiracy theorists

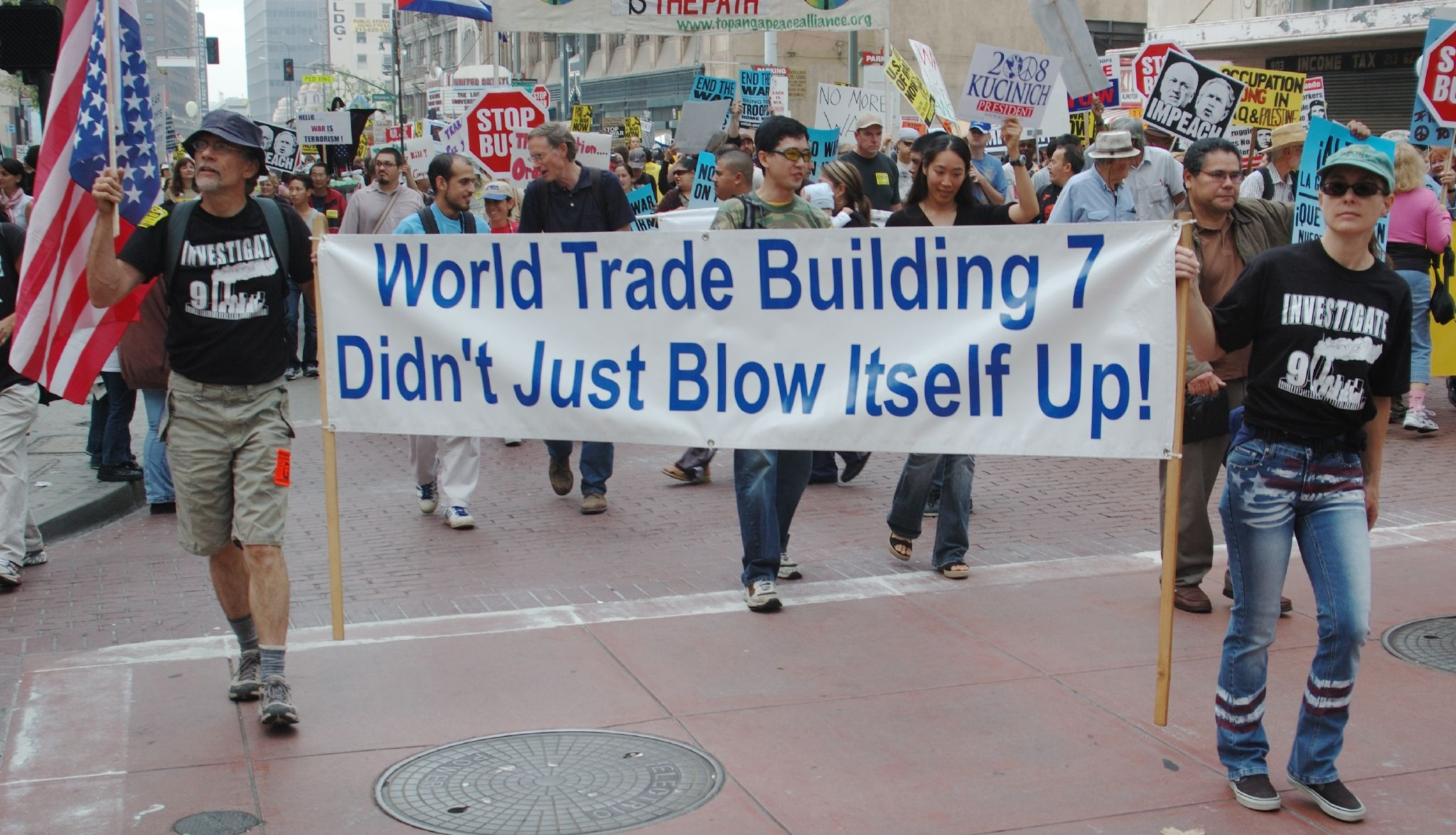
Supporters of the 9/11 Truth movement at an anti-war demonstration in Los Angeles, October 2007

The 9/11 truth movement encompasses a disparate group of adherents to a set of overlapping conspiracy theories that dispute the general consensus of the September 11 attacks that a group of Al-Qaeda terrorists had hijacked four airliners and crashed them into the Pentagon and the original World Trade Center Twin Towers, which consequently collapsed. The primary focus is what the movement perceives as missed information that they allege is not adequately explained in the official National Institute of Standards and Technology (NIST) reports, such as the collapse of 7 World Trade Center. They believe in a cover-up and, at the least, complicity by insiders.

They analyze evidence from the attacks, come up with different conspiracy theories about how the attacks happened and call for a new investigation into the attacks. Some of the organizations claim that there is evidence that individuals within the United States government may have been either responsible for or knowingly complicit in the September 11 attacks. Motives suggested by the movement include the use of the attacks as a pretext to fight wars in Iraq and Afghanistan and to create opportunities to curtail American civil liberties. The movement and their claims are not supported and have been frequently criticized by the civil and aerospace engineering communities.

== Characteristics ==
=== Name ===
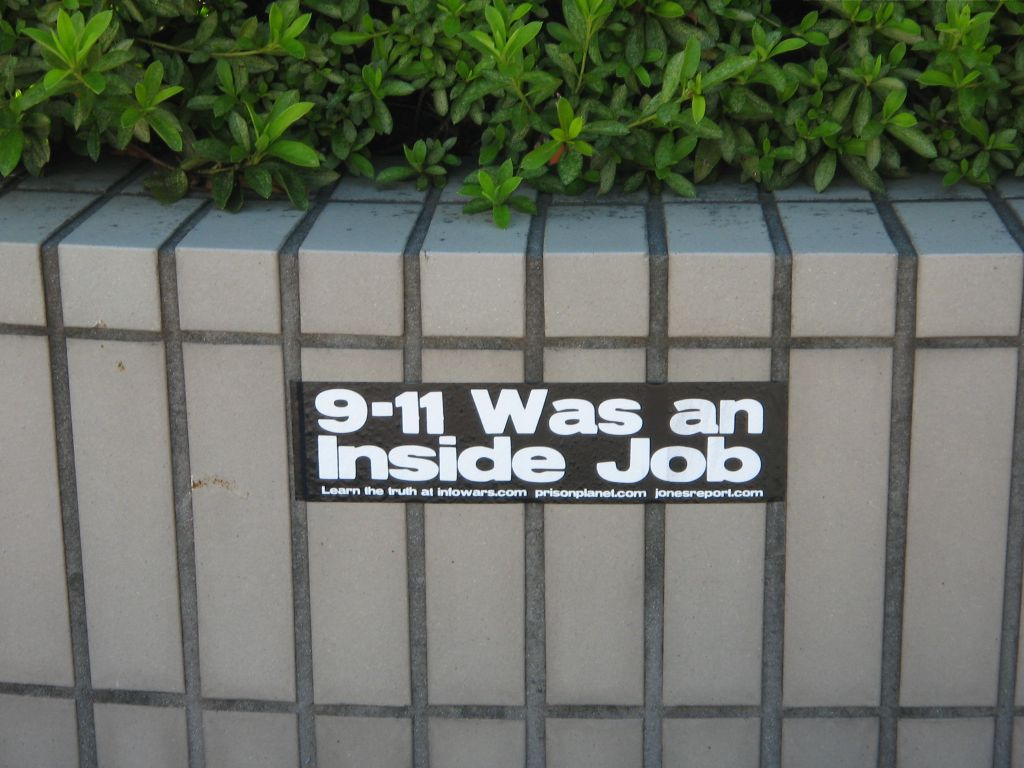
Infowars sticker (pictured in 2006) promoting the conspiracy theory that the September 11 attacks were orchestrated by the US government

"9/11 truth movement" is a term that has been applied to loosely affiliated organizations and individuals who allege that the United States government, agencies of the United States or individuals within such agencies were either responsible for or purposefully complicit in the September 11 attacks. The term is also being used by the adherents of the movement, who call themselves "9/11 skeptics", "truth activists", or "9/11 truthers", while generally rejecting the term "conspiracy theorists".

=== Adherents ===
Adherents of the movement come from diverse social backgrounds. The movement has drawn supporters from people of diverse political beliefs including liberals, conservatives, and libertarians.

Lev Grossman of Time magazine has stated that support for the movement is not a "fringe phenomenon", but "a mainstream political reality." Others, such as Ben Smith of Politico and the Minneapolis Star Tribune have stated that the movement has been "relegated to the fringe". The Washington Post editorial staff went further describing the movement as "lunatic fringe." Mark Fenster, a University of Florida law professor and author of the book Conspiracy Theories: Secrecy and Power in American Culture, says that "the amount of organisation" of the movement is significantly stronger than the organizations of the movement related to the JFK assassination conspiracy theories, though this is likely the result of new media technologies, such as online social networks, blogs, etc.

The movement is active in the US as well as in other countries.

In 2004, John Buchanan ran for president on a 9/11 truth platform. Jeff Boss ran in the 2008, 2012, 2016, and 2020 US presidential elections on platforms promoting the movement.

In a 2011 article in Skeptical Inquirer, Jamie Bartlett and Carl Miller gave an overview and analyzed the members of the 9/11 truth movement. The authors found that people involved in this movement, which seemingly is a disparate group with very diversified backgrounds, could be classified into three groups. They join the movement for different reasons, loosely self-assemble to fill different roles, and are united by their shared mistrust in experts and the establishment (government and reputable sources of knowledge) and have a conspiratorial stance. Together, they contribute to the exaggerated claims of acceptance (in general public) of the movement.

=== Views ===
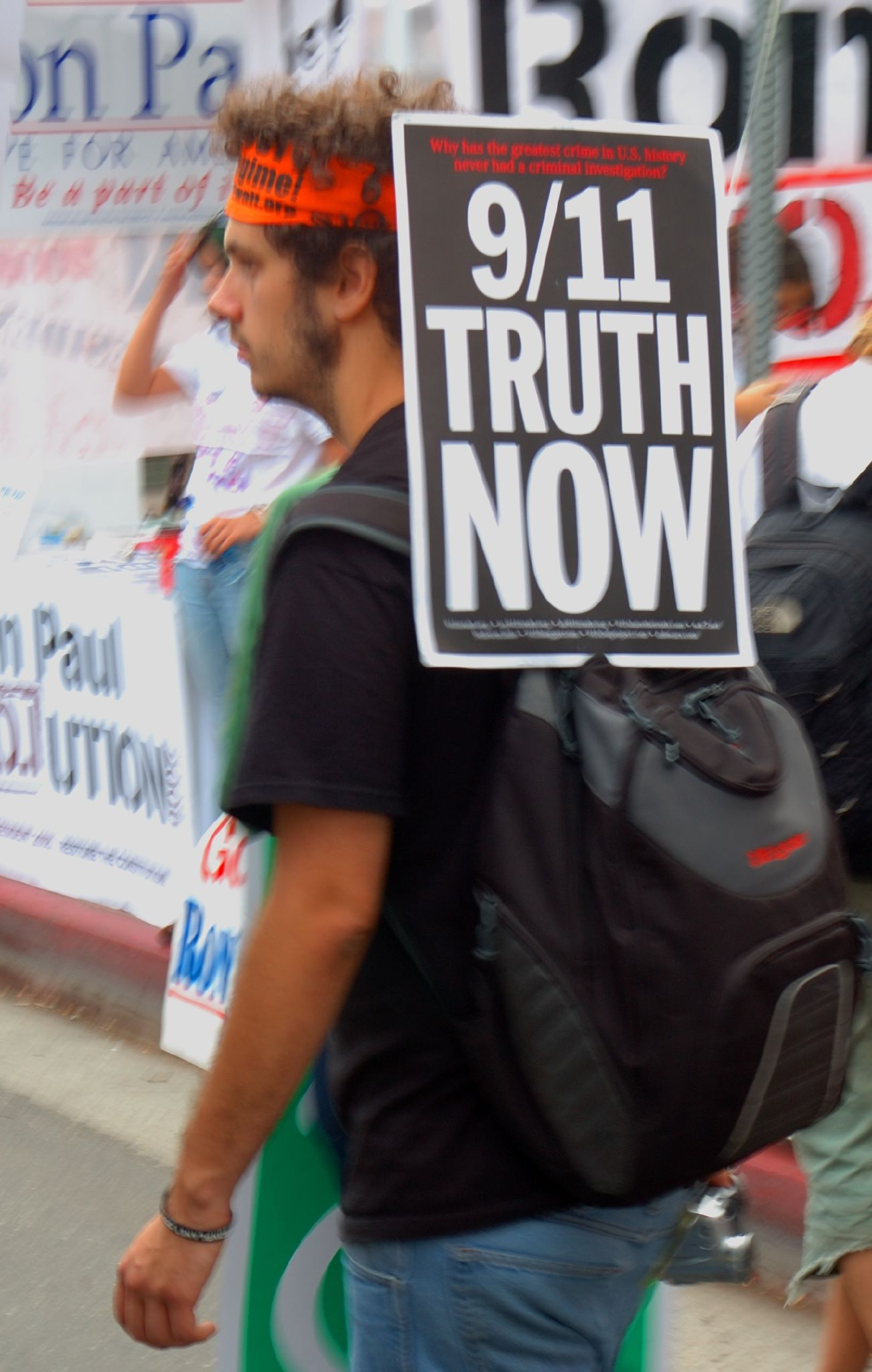
9/11 Truth protester.

Many believers in the movement say that US government insiders played a part in the attacks, or may have known the attacks were imminent, and did nothing to alert others or stop them. Some within the movement who argue that insiders within the US government were directly responsible for the September 11 attacks often allege that the attacks were planned and executed in order to provide the US with a pretext for going to war in the Middle East, and, by extension, as a means of consolidating power.

According to these allegations, this would have given the Bush administration the justification for widespread abuses of civil liberties and to invade Afghanistan and Iraq to ensure future supplies of oil. And according to the conspiracy, in some cases even in the mainstream media, "hawks" in the White House, especially then vice-president Dick Cheney and members of the Project for the New American Century, the neoconservative think-tank, would have allegedly been aware of, or involved in, the alleged plot.

A relatively common, but not exclusive view within the movement alleges that the buildings of the World Trade Center were destroyed by controlled demolition.

=== Communication ===
The Internet plays a large role both in the communication between adherents and between local groups of the 9/11 truth movement and in the dissemination of the views of the movement to the public at large. Colorado Public Television has aired several films produced by the movement such as 9/11 Explosive Evidence: Experts Speak Out, a documentary produced by Architects and Engineers for 9/11 Truth, which once was one of the "most shared" and "most watched" programs on the national PBS site. The station's airing of the film attracted much controversy for the affiliate and PBS.

== History ==
Months before the attack, in June and July 2001, two of the conspiracy theory's earliest proponents, William Cooper and Alex Jones, claimed that the US government planned terror attacks that would be blamed on Osama bin Laden. Both began broadcasting the "controlled demolition" conspiracy theory on the day of the 9/11 attacks. Jones went on to become "one of the loudest voices in the self-styled 9/11 Truth movement".

In the aftermath of the September 11 attacks, different interpretations of the events that questioned the account given by the US government were published. Among others, Michael Ruppert and Canadian journalist Barrie Zwicker, published criticisms or pointed out purported anomalies of the accepted account of the attacks. French author Jean-Charles Brisard and German authors Mathias Bröckers and Andreas von Bülow published books critical of media reporting and advancing the controlled demolition thesis of the destruction of the World Trade Center towers. In September 2002, the first "Bush Did It!" rallies and marches were held in San Francisco and Oakland, California, organized by The All People's Coalition.

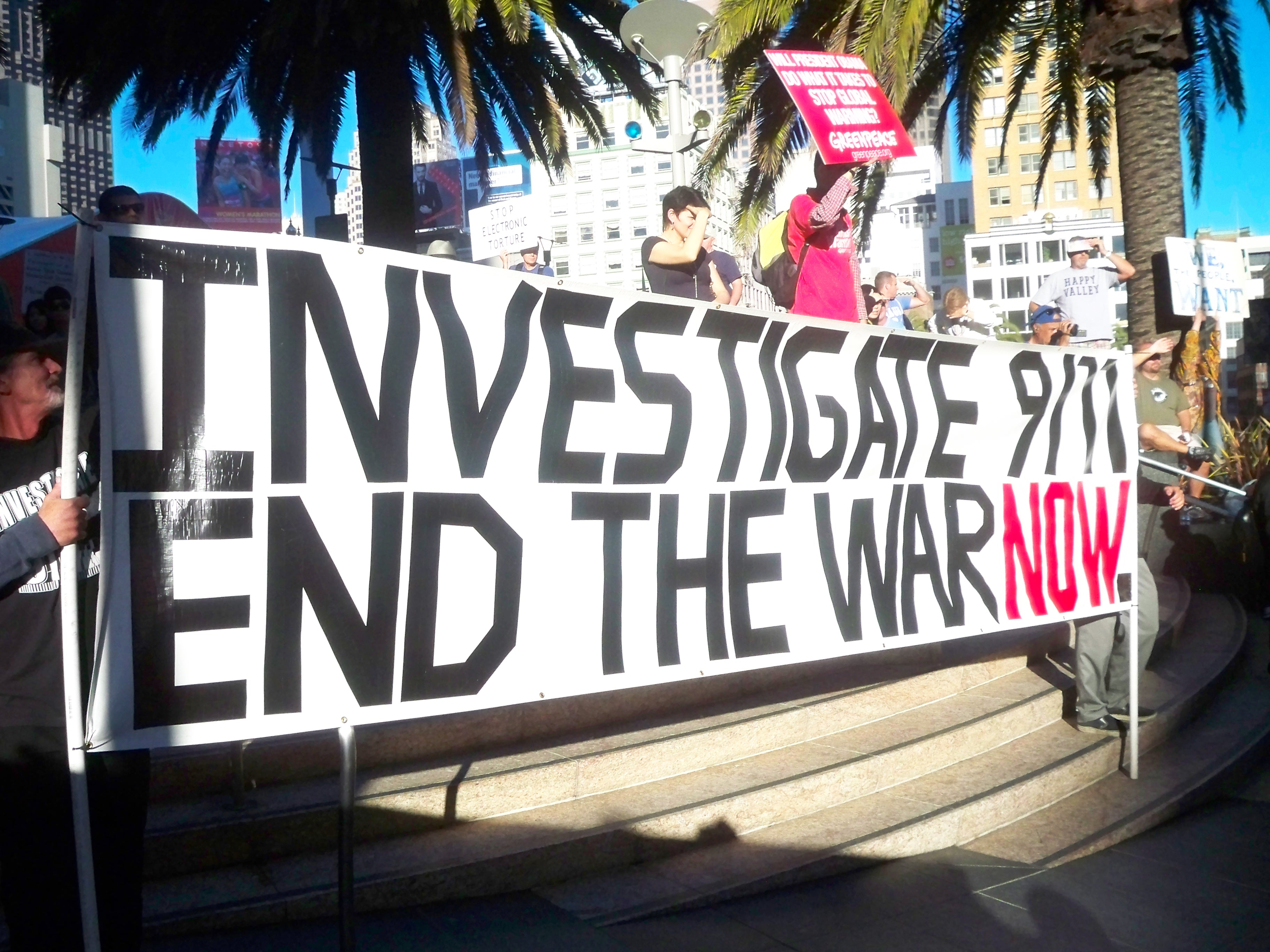
A 9/11 truth movement protest sign, October 2009

In October 2004, the organization 9/11 Truth released a statement, signed by nearly 200 people, including many relatives of people who perished on September 11, 2001, that calls for an investigation into the attacks. It also asserted that unanswered questions would suggest that people within the administration of President George W. Bush may have deliberately allowed the attacks to happen. Actor Edward Asner, former presidential candidate Ralph Nader, former congresswoman Cynthia McKinney, former assistant secretary of housing Catherine Austin Fitts, author Richard Heinberg, professors Richard Falk of the University of California, Mark Crispin Miller of New York University, and others signed the statement. In 2009, Van Jones, a former advisor to President Obama, said he had not fully reviewed the statement before he signed and that the petition did not reflect his views "now or ever".

In 2006, Steven E. Jones, who became a leading proponent of the controlled demolition conspiracy theory, published the paper "Why Indeed Did the WTC Buildings Completely Collapse?". He was placed on paid leave by Brigham Young University following what they described as Jones's "increasingly speculative and accusatory" statements in September 2006, pending a review of his statements and research. Six weeks later, Jones retired from the university. Wide skepticism arose as to the scientific claims made by Jones and the efficacy of the peer-review process involved in the publication of his claim, and conspiracy theorists responded to criticism by positing even more elaborate and ostensible cover-ups.

In the same year, 61 legislators in the US state of Wisconsin signed a petition calling for the dismissal of a University of Wisconsin lecturer Kevin Barrett, after he joined the group Scholars for 9/11 Truth. Citing academic freedom, the university provost declined to take action against Barrett.

Several organizations of family members of people who have died in the attacks have called for an independent investigation into the attacks. In 2009, a group of people, including 9/11 truth activist Lorie Van Auken and others who have lost friends or relatives in the attack, appealed to the City of New York to investigate the disaster. The New York City Coalition for Accountability Now collected signatures to require the New York City Council to place the creation of an investigating commission on the November 2009 election ballot. The group collected more than enough signatures to put the proposal before the voters, but New York Supreme Court Justice Edward Lehner stated that the petition overstepped what is allowable by city law, and ruled that, despite wording in the petition to allow for elements ruled invalid to be stricken, it would not be allowed to appear on the ballot.

=== 9/11 Commission's Commission Report ===
According to some members of the 9/11 truth movement, many of the questions that the 9/11 Family Steering Committee put to the 9/11 Commission, chaired by former New Jersey Governor Thomas Kean, were not asked in either the hearings nor in the Commission Report. Lorie Van Auken, one of the Jersey Girls, estimates that only 30% of their questions were answered in the final 9/11 Commission Report, published July 22, 2004.

The 9/11 Family Steering Committee produced a website summarizing the questions they had raised to the commission, indicating which they believe had been answered satisfactorily, which they believe had been addressed but not answered satisfactorily, and which they believe had been generally ignored in or omitted from the Report.

In addition, The 9/11 Commission Report: Omissions and Distortions, written by David Ray Griffin, claimed the report had either omitted information or distorted the truth, providing 115 examples of his allegations. Griffin has called the 9/11 Commission Report "a 571-page lie".

On May 26, 2008, adjunct religious studies professor Blair Gadsby began a protest and a hunger strike outside the offices of Senator and Republican Party nominee for President John McCain's office requesting McCain meet with the principal scientists and leaders of the 9/11 truth movement, specifically Richard Gage, Steven E. Jones, and David Ray Griffin. McCain had written the foreword to the book Debunking 9/11 Myths: Why Conspiracy Theories Can't Stand Up to the Facts, published by the magazine Popular Mechanics.

Arizona Republican State Senator Karen Johnson joined the protest in support. On June 10, Johnson with Gadsby as her guest and other 9/11 truth movement members in the audience, spoke before the Arizona State Senate espousing the controlled demolition theory and supporting a reopening of the 9/11 investigation.

=== FEMA and NIST report reactions ===
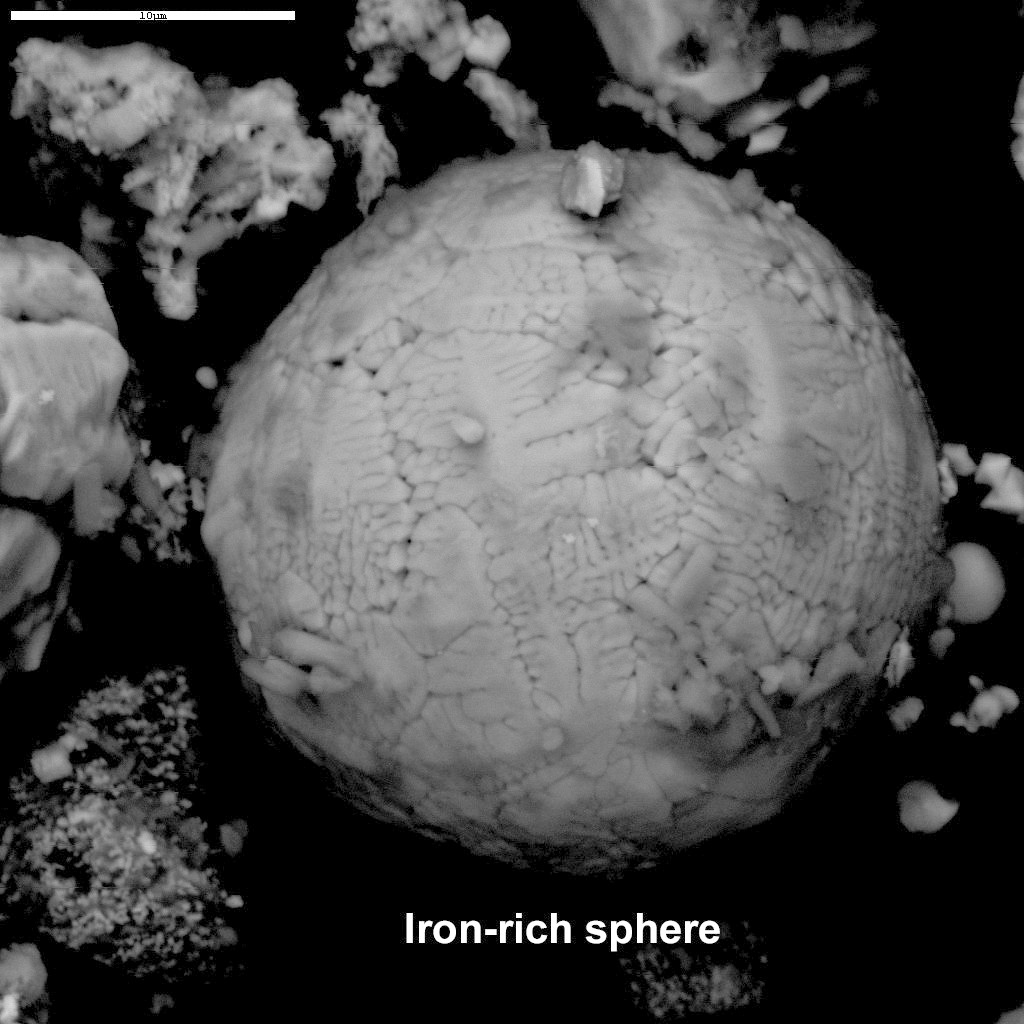
An iron-rich sphere, found in the dust of the World Trade Center, as documented by the United States Geological Survey and RJ LeeGroup, Inc. RJ Lee's report states the spheres are indicative of molten iron. Members of the 9/11 truth movement claim the spheres indicate the presence of temperatures much hotter than office fires, or the presence of thermitic reactions. However, such spheres have been found to form when iron particles are affected by normal fuel fires.

Following the initial government investigation, the Federal Emergency Management Agency issued FEMA 403 in May 2002, titled World Trade Center Building Performance Study: Data Collection, Preliminary Observations, and Recommendations. The National Institute of Standards and Technology (NIST) subsequently issued final reports on building collapse in 2005 and 2008.

Numerous responses to these reports were written by members of the 9/11 truth movement. Many of these responses claimed that it ignored key evidence suggesting an explosive demolition, "distorted reality" by using deceptive language and diagrams, and depicted the report(s) as consisting of straw man arguments, such as the 2005 article by Jim Hoffman entitled Building a better mirage: NIST's 3-year $20,000,000 Cover Up of the Crime of the Century.

In late 2005, Steven E. Jones, then a professor at Brigham Young University, announced a paper criticizing the NIST Report and describing his hypothesis that the WTC towers had been intentionally demolished by explosives. This paper garnered some mainstream media attention, including an appearance by Jones on MSNBC. This was the first such programming on a major cable news station. Jones was criticized by his university for making his claims public before vetting them through the approved peer review process. He was placed on paid leave and has since retired.

Accordingly, in April 2007, some 9/11 victims' family members and some members of the new Scholars for 9/11 Truth and Justice submitted an additional request for correction to NIST, containing their own views on the defects in the report. NIST responded to this request in September 2007 supporting their original conclusions; the originators of the request wrote back to them in October 2007, asking them to reconsider their response.

=== Pamphlets at National September 11 Museum ===
Members of the movement distributed pamphlets that they say told the "truth" about the attacks at the National September 11 Memorial & Museum when the Museum opened in May 2014.

== Organizations ==
Since the publication of the official reports, a number of interconnected 9/11 truth movement organizations have been formed.

=== Architects & Engineers for 9/11 Truth ===
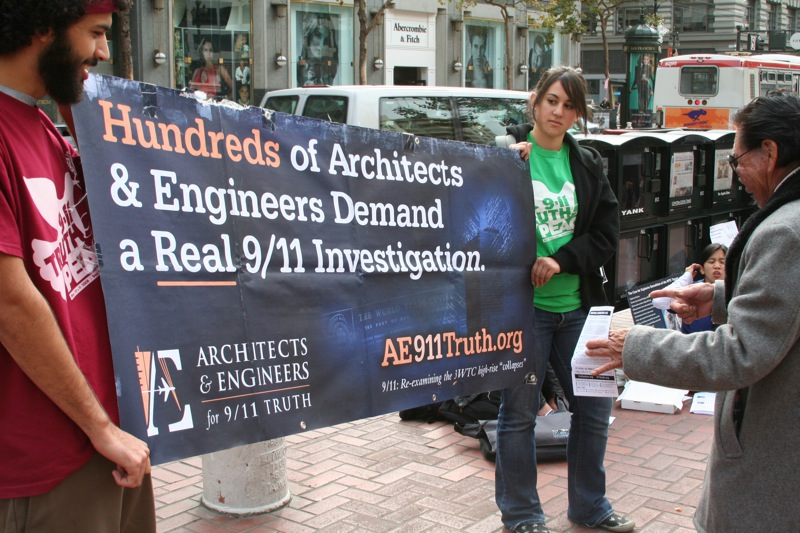
Two people holding a banner of Architects & Engineers for 9/11 Truth

Architects & Engineers for 9/11 Truth is an organization of architectural and engineering professionals who support the World Trade Center controlled demolition conspiracy theories and are calling for a new investigation into the destruction of the Twin Towers and WTC 7. The group is collecting signatures for a petition to the United States Congress that demands "a truly independent investigation with subpoena power" of the September 11 attacks, which, according to the organization, should include an inquiry into the possible use of explosives in the destruction of the World Trade Center buildings. Richard Gage, a San Francisco Bay area-based architect, founded Architects & Engineers for 9/11 Truth in 2006.

Investigations by the Federal Emergency Management Agency and the National Institute of Standards and Technology (NIST) have concluded that the buildings collapsed as a result of the impacts of the planes and of the fires that resulted from them. Gage criticized NIST for not having investigated the complete sequence of the collapse of the World Trade Center towers in its report, and claims "the official explanation of the total destruction of the World Trade Center skyscrapers has explicitly failed to address the massive evidence for explosive demolition". To support its position, the group Architects & Engineers for 9/11 Truth points to the "free fall" pace of the collapse of the buildings, the "lateral ejection of steel", and to the "mid-air pulverization of concrete", the "molten metal", among other things.

=== 9/11 Truth ===
9/11 Truth was launched in June 2004 and has become a central portal for many 9/11 truth movement organizations. It is run by Janice Matthews (executive director), David Kubiak (International Campaign Advisor) and Mike Berger (Media Coordinator), among others, and its advisory board includes Steven E. Jones and Barrie Zwicker.

The organization co-sponsored opinion polls conducted by the U.S. market research and opinion polling firm Zogby International that have shown substantial numbers of people believing the government did not tell the full truth about the September 11 attacks.

=== Scholars for 9/11 Truth ===
The original Scholars for 9/11 Truth was founded by James H. Fetzer, a former philosophy professor, and physicist Steven E. Jones, in December 2005. It was a group of people of differing backgrounds and expertise who rejected the mainstream media and government account of the September 11 attacks. Initially, the group invited many ideas and hypotheses to be considered. However, leading members soon came to feel that the inclusion of some theories advocated by Fetzer—such as the use of directed energy weapons or miniature nuclear bombs to destroy the Twin Towers—were insufficiently supported by evidence and were exposing the group to ridicule. By December 2006, Jones and others set up a new scholars group, Scholars for 9/11 Truth and Justice, which described its focus as the use of scientific analysis. The original members took a vote on which group to join and the majority voted to move to the new group.

=== Scholars for 9/11 Truth & Justice ===
Scholars for 9/11 Truth & Justice (STJ) formed in January 2007 and is a self-described "group of scholars and supporters endeavoring to address the unanswered questions of the September 11, 2001 attack through scientific research and public education". The group is composed of more than 900 members, including Richard Gage, Steven E. Jones, Jim Hoffman, David Ray Griffin, and former Congressman Daniel Hamburg. Most members support the conspiracy theory that the World Trade Center Towers and the third skyscraper, WTC 7, were destroyed through explosive demolition.

In 2008 and 2009, several members of the Scholars for 9/11 Truth & Justice published essays in science and engineering journals. In April 2008, a letter by some of its members, was published in The Open Civil Engineering Journal. In July 2008, an article by Steven E. Jones and others was published in The Environmentalist.

In October 2008, a comment by STJ member James R. Gourley describing what he considers fundamental errors in a Bažant and Verdure paper was included in an issue of the Journal of Engineering Mechanics. In April 2009, Danish chemist and STJ member Niels H. Harrit, of the University of Copenhagen, and eight other authors, including some STJ members, published a paper in The Open Chemical Physics Journal, entitled Active Thermitic Material Discovered in Dust from the 9/11 World Trade Center Catastrophe. The paper, which caused the editor and only peer-reviewer, Professor Pileni, to resign, claiming it was published without her knowledge, concludes that chips consisting of unreacted and partially reacted nano-thermite ("super-thermite") appear to be present in samples of the dust.

=== 9/11 Citizens Watch ===
9/11 Citizens Watch was formed in 2002 by John Judge and Kyle Hence and, along with the Family Steering Committee, played an active role in calling for the establishment of the 9/11 Commission, and monitoring the commission closely.

William Rodriguez at American Scholars Symposium: 9/11 and the NeoCon Agenda in Los Angeles, California, June 24–25, 2006

=== 9/11 Commission Campaign ===
Founded in 2011 by Senator Mike Gravel, the 9/11 Commission Campaign's objective is to enact subpoena-capable, state-level commissions through state ballot initiatives, namely in Oregon, Alaska and California. These commissions are envisioned as citizen-driven, independent organizations that would form a semi-unified grassroots national presence by exercising joint powers authority.

=== Hispanic Victims Group ===
The Hispanic Victims Group is a group created after the 9/11 attacks, founded by William Rodriguez, a supporter of the 9/11 truth movement. The group was one of the key forces behind the creation of the 9/11 Commission. William Rodriguez, as founder of the group, was a member of the Families Advisory Council for the Lower Manhattan Development Corporation (LMDC).

=== Conferences ===
Members of the 9/11 truth organizations, such as 911truth.org and Scholars for 9/11 Truth and Justice, held meetings and conferences to discuss ongoing research about 9/11 and to strategize about how best to achieve their goals during the early 2000s and 2010s. Many of these conferences are organized by 911truth.org, and some have been covered by the international media.

== Criticism ==
Matt Taibbi of Rolling Stone assessed that the movement "gives supporters of Bush an excuse to dismiss critics of this administration", and expressed concerns about the number of people who believe in 9/11 conspiracy theories.

Massachusetts Institute of Technology (MIT) engineering professor Thomas W. Eagar was at first unwilling to engage with the claims of the movement, saying that "if (the argument) gets too mainstream, I'll engage in the debate". In response to Steven E. Jones' publication of a hypothesis that the World Trade Center was destroyed by controlled demolition, Eagar said that adherents of the 9/11 truth movement would use the reverse scientific method to arrive at their conclusions, as they "determine what happened, throw out all the data that doesn't fit their conclusion, and then hail their findings as the only possible conclusion".

Calling conspiracy theorists "the truthers", Bill Moyers has quoted journalist Robert Parry by stating that the theorists "... threw out all the evidence of al-Qaeda's involvement, from contemporaneous calls from hijack victims on the planes to confessions from al-Qaeda leaders both in and out of captivity that they had indeed done it. Then, recycling some of the right's sophistry techniques, such as using long lists of supposed evidence to overcome the lack of any real evidence, the 'truthers' cherry-picked a few supposed 'anomalies' to build an 'inside-job' story line".

Al-Qaeda criticized Iran's ex-president, Mahmoud Ahmadinejad suggestions that the US government was behind the September 11 attacks as "ridiculous".

Some skeptics, after extensive research, have found most of the questions posed by the Truthers to be either easily answered, or are based on misleading or false ideas. They have said that some Truthers are knowingly disseminating disinformation with no regard for the grieving families.

== Media ==
=== Books ===
- The Mysterious Collapse of World Trade Center 7: Why the Final Official Report About 9/11 Is Unscientific and False (2009) by David Ray Griffin
- In September 2004, the interactive "Complete 9/11 Timeline" website by Paul Thompson, a collection of mainstream media reports presented chronologically, was made into the book, entitled The Terror Timeline.
- The Most Dangerous Book in the World: 9/11 as Mass Ritual (2012) by S.K. Bain. An "investigation into the occult aspects of 9/11"

=== Films ===
Films made by people associated with the 9/11 truth movement include:

- The Great Conspiracy: The 9/11 News Special You Never Saw (2005) by Barrie Zwicker
- Martial Law 9/11: Rise of the Police State (2005) by Alex Jones
- 9/11: Press for Truth (2006) by Ray Nowosielski
- 911 Mysteries Part 1: Demolitions (2006) by Sofia Shafquat
- Zeitgeist: The Movie (part ii) (2007) by Peter Joseph
- 9/11: Blueprint for Truth (2007) and updated 9/11: Blueprint for Truth – The Architecture of Destruction (2008) by Richard Gage
- The New American Century (2007) by Massimo Mazzucco
- Loose Change: An American Coup (2009) by Dylan Avery
- New World Order (2009) by Luke Meyer and Andrew Neel
- 9/11: Explosive Evidence – Experts Speak Out (2012) by Architects & Engineers for 9/11 Truth
- September 11: The New Pearl Harbor (2013), a five-hour documentary by Massimo Mazzucco
- The Anatomy of a Great Deception (2014) by David Hooper

=== Articles ===
- 9/11 as False Flag: Why International Law Must Dare to Care (2017) by Amy Benjamin, published in the African Journal of International and Comparative Law

== See also ==
- The 28 pages
