= Amy Benjamin =

American conspiracy theorist

Amy Baker Benjamin
- Born: 1965 (age 60–61); California, U.S.

Academic background
- Education: Princeton University (BA); Yale University (JD)

Academic work
- Sub-discipline: International law
- Institutions: Auckland University of Technology (2016–2021)

Amy Baker Benjamin (born 1965) is an American lawyer and former New Zealand-based academic focusing on international law. She has attracted media attention for her support of conspiracy theories.

== Background ==
Benjamin was born and raised in the San Francisco, California area. She attended Princeton University as an undergraduate, graduating in 1988 with a Bachelor of Arts in history, and earned a Juris Doctor from Yale Law School in 1993.

== Career ==
After graduation, Benjamin clerked for Stephen Breyer, then a judge on the United States Court of Appeals for the First Circuit, and worked as an Assistant United States Attorney for the United States Department of Justice in the Southern District of New York.

In 2016, Benjamin was hired as a lecturer at the Auckland University of Technology Law School. During this time, she published five scholarly articles, with topics discussed including purported United States regime change efforts in Libya and Syria, the United States' relationship with the United Nations, and governmental secrecy. In one 2017 article, "9/11 As False Flag: Why International Law Must Dare to Care", published in the African Journal of International and Comparative Law, Benjamin asserted her belief that the September 11th attacks were a false flag event orchestrated by the United States government. While a lecturer, Benjamin also appeared as a commentator on various news shows in New Zealand, including The Project and Newshub.

Benjamin made headlines in August 2021 for denouncing lockdowns due to the COVID-19 pandemic as a "crime against humanity", being one of the few academics to publicly criticize New Zealand's pandemic policies. She subsequently created controversy in November 2021 after claiming, in an interview with conspiracy theorist Vinny Eastwood, that the 2019 Christchurch mosque shootings were a false flag. Having resigned from her teaching position in September 2021, Benjamin left Auckland University of Technology effective January 2022.

Benjamin publicly supported Donald Trump in the 2020 United States presidential election and has alleged that the election was stolen. She was profiled in a 2022 Stuff documentary, Fire and Fury, about disinformation in New Zealand. The original version of the documentary falsely stated that Benjamin had resigned from AUT following her interview with Vinny Eastwood. Stuff later issued a retraction and apology.

=== We, Macbeth ===
A play written by Benjamin, We, Macbeth, was performed at London's Theatro Technis in 2014. It was published under the pseudonym "James Hepburn" and directed by George Eugeniou. The play depicts events such as 9/11, the assassination of John F. Kennedy and the Watergate scandal as an interconnected plot by United States government and intelligence figures, presented as a series of revelations recorded by a typist named Clarence. Howard Loxton for British Theatre Guide praised the cast's performances, and described both the play's portrayal of the ruthlessness of power and the plausibility of its events as "chillingly disturbing". Everything Theatre gave the play three stars, commending the plot and staging as "fantastic and gripping" while acknowledging some uneven acting performances.

== Journal articles ==
- Benjamin, Amy Baker (October 1, 1993). "The Jurisdictional Implications of a Mens Rea Approach to Insanity: Plugging the "Detainment Gap" after Foucha v, Louisiana". University of Dayton Law Review. 19 (1): 41–82.
- Benjamin, Amy Baker (September 25, 2015). "To Wreck a State: The New International Crime". New Criminal Law Review. 19 (2): 208–235. doi:10.1525/nclr.2016.19.2.208. SSRN 2665893.
- Benjamin, Amy Baker (July 26, 2017). "9/11 as False Flag: Why International Law Must Dare to Care". African Journal of International and Comparative Law. 25 (3): 371–392. doi:10.3366/ajicl.2017.0200. hdl:10292/10739. SSRN 3009498.
- Benjamin, Amy Baker (September 18, 2017). "The Many Faces of Secrecy". William & Mary Policy Review. 8 (2): 1–49. SSRN 3038640.
- Benjamin, Amy Baker (May 24, 2018). "Syria: The Unbearable Lightness of Intervention". Wisconsin International Law Journal. 35 (3): 515–548. SSRN 4684631.
- Benjamin, Amy Baker (December 20, 2019). "Globalists and the Corruption of Sources". Georgia Journal of International and Comparative Law. 48 (1): 87–155. SSRN 3507762.
