= Tampa Heights Historic District =

Historic district in Florida, United States

- U.S. National Register of Historic Places
- U.S. Historic district
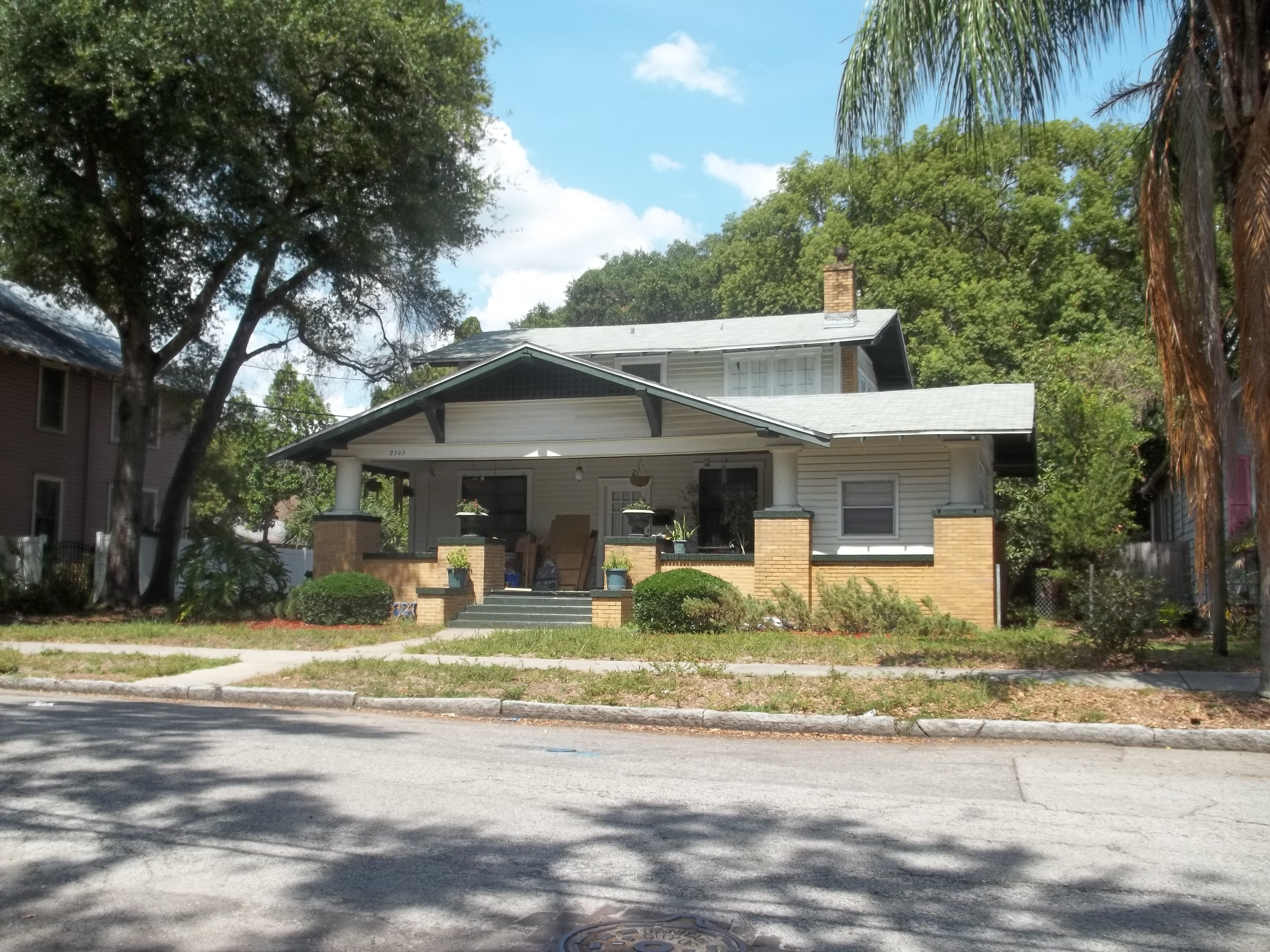

- Location within Florida Location within the United States
- Location: Tampa, Florida
- Coordinates: 27°57′54″N 82°27′27″W
- Area: 200 acres (0.81 km^{2})
- NRHP reference No.: 95000979
- Added to NRHP: August 4, 1995

The Tampa Heights Historic District is a U.S. historic district in Tampa, Florida. It is bounded by Adalee Street, I-275, 7th Avenue and North Tampa Avenue, encompasses approximately 200 acres (0.81 km^{2}), and contains 289 historic buildings. On August 4, 1995, it was added to the U.S. National Register of Historic Places. The district includes Lee Elementary School of Technology World Studies, the first brick school in Hillsborough County, Florida.

== Gallery ==
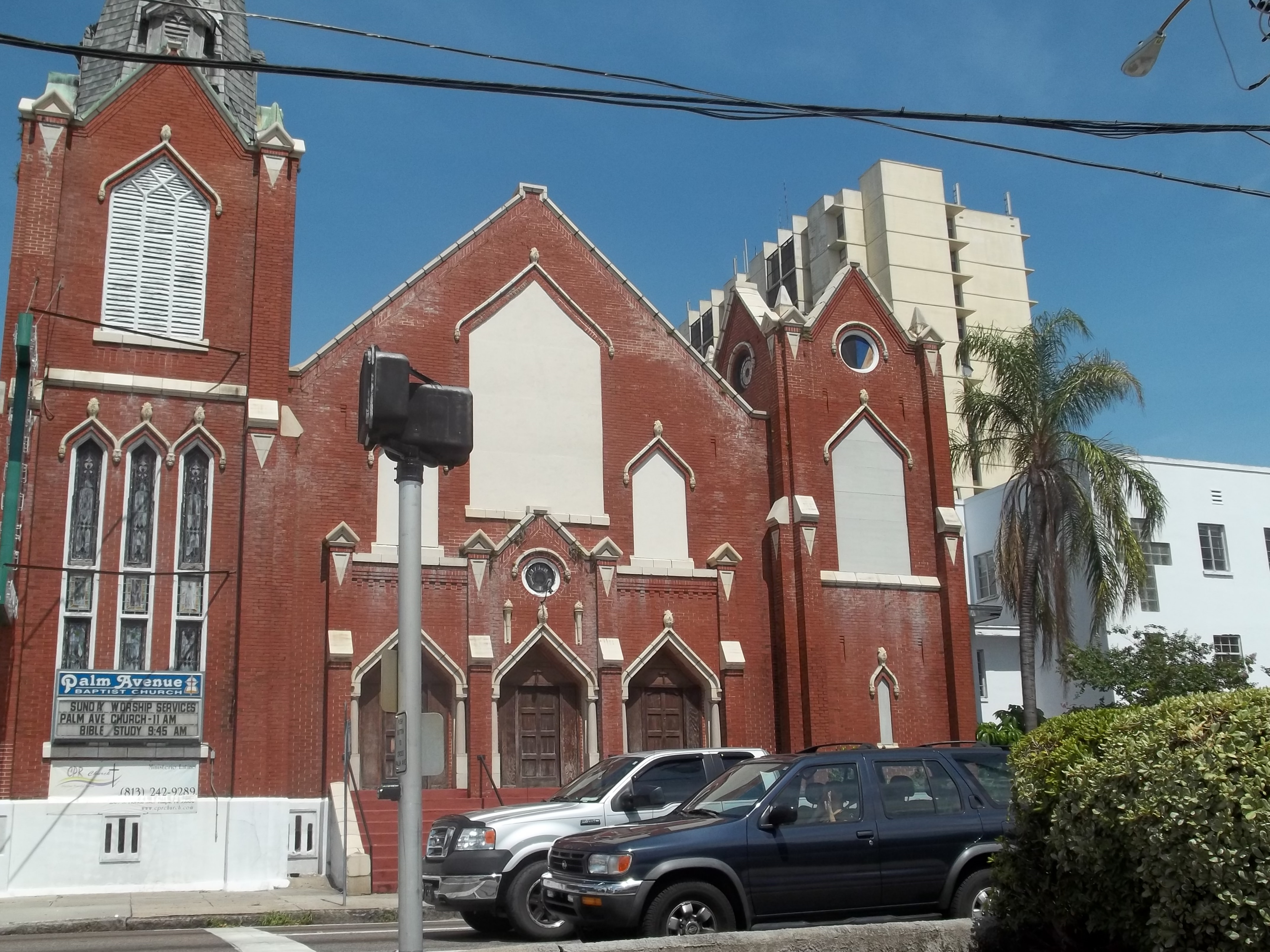
Palm Avenue Baptist Church

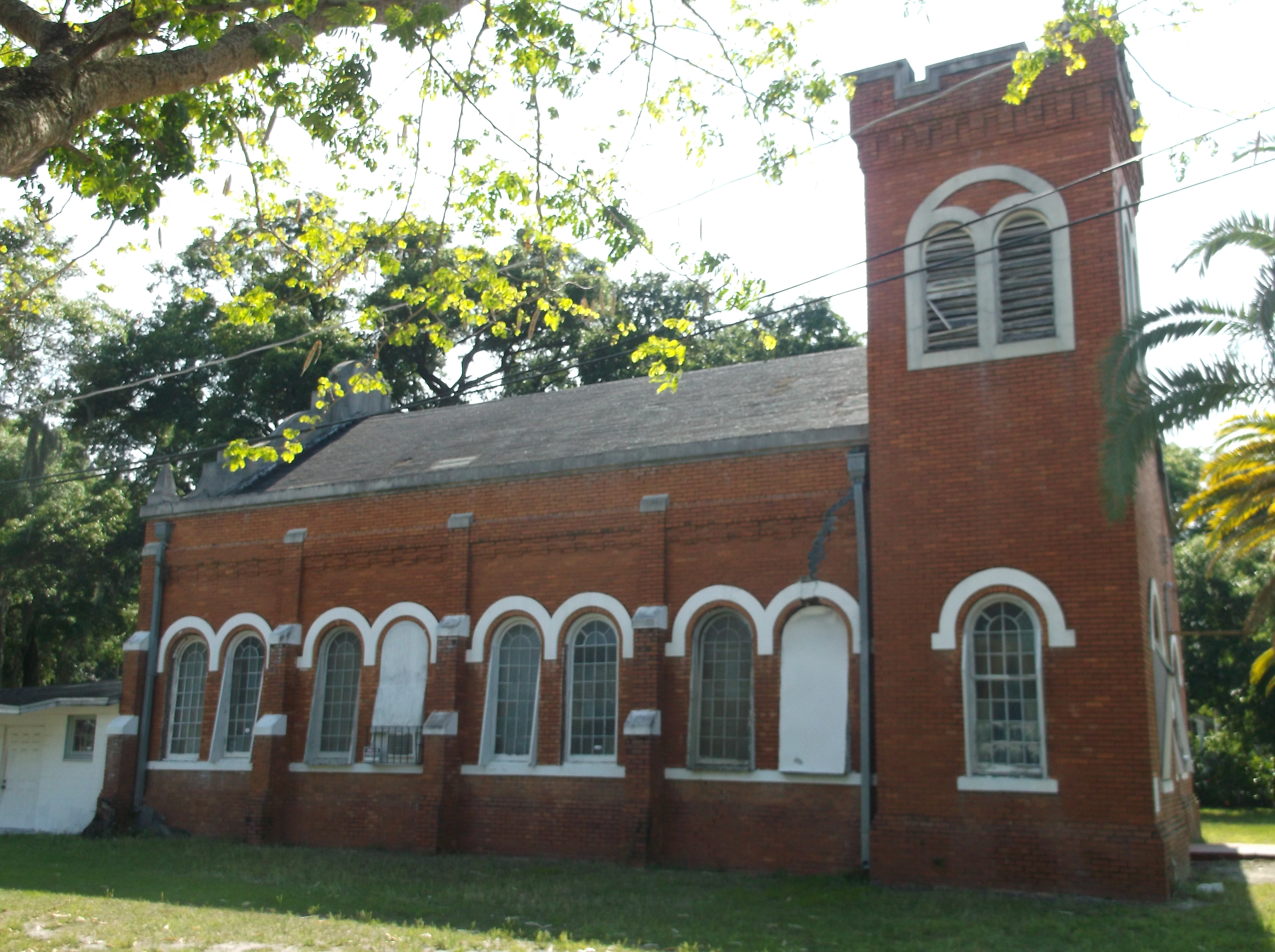
Bethel Primitive Baptist Church on Columbus Drive.
