= St. James House of Prayer Episcopal Church =

Historic church in Florida, United States

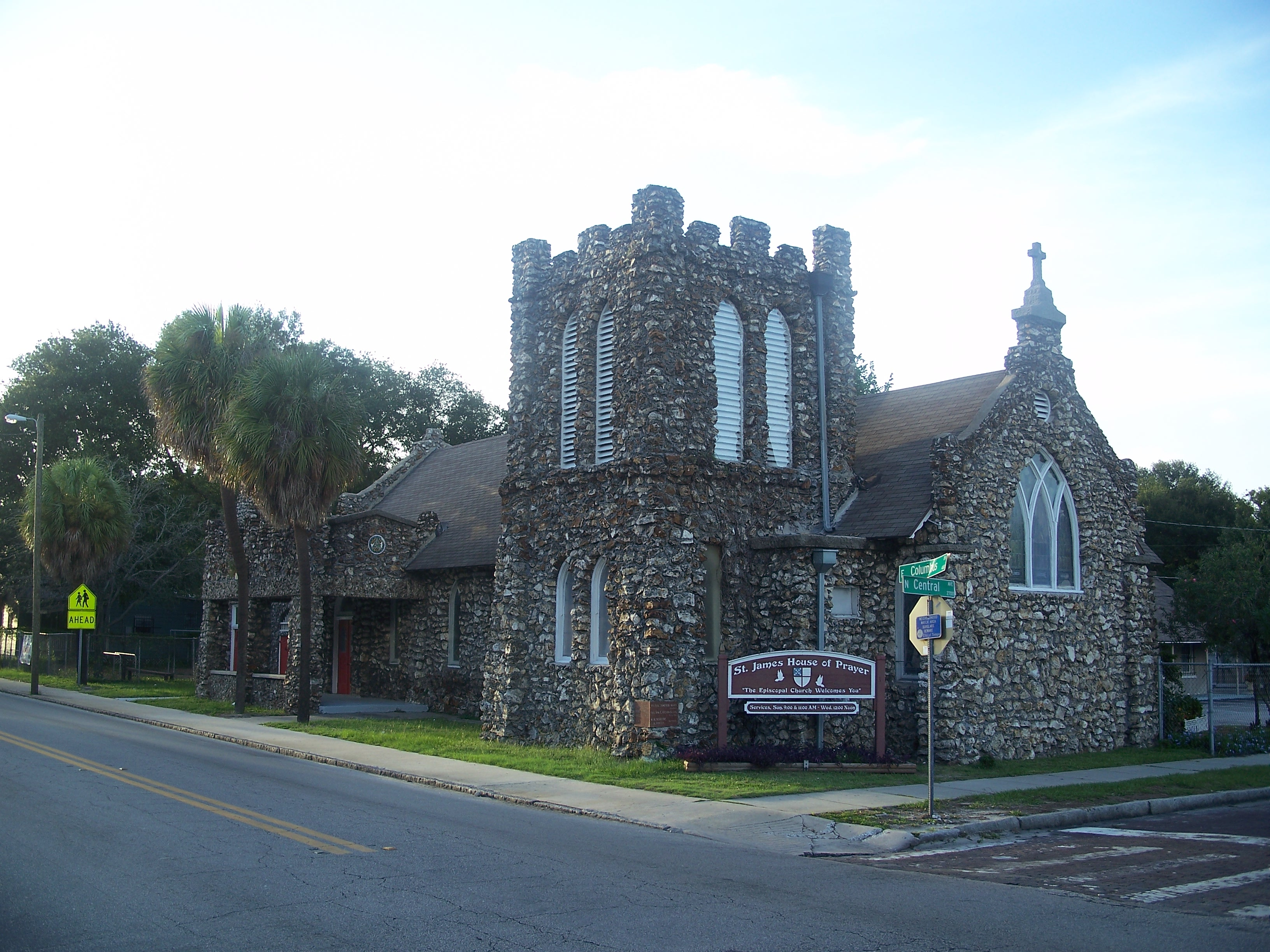

Religion
- Affiliation: Episcopal Church
- Province: Province IV (Sewanee)
- Leadership: The Rev. Ernestein C. Flemister, Rector
- Status: Active parish

Location
- Location: 2708 North Central Avenue and Columbus Drive (Tampa, Florida); Tampa, Florida; USA
- Interactive map of St. James House of Prayer; Episcopal Church
- Territory: Diocese of Southwest Florida

Website
- http://www.sjhoptpa.org/
- Episcopal House of Prayer
- U.S. National Register of Historic Places
- U.S. Historic district – Contributing property
- Location within Florida Location within the United States
- Coordinates: 27°58′0″N 82°27′20″W
- Built: 1922
- Architect: Louis A. Fort
- Part of: Tampa Heights Historic District (ID95000979)
- NRHP reference No.: 91000105

Significant dates
- Added to NRHP: February 21, 1991
- Designated CP: August 4, 1995

St. James House of Prayer Episcopal Church, also known as the Episcopal House of Prayer, is an active Episcopal parish and historic church building in Tampa, Florida, United States. It is located at 2708 Central Avenue in the city's Tampa Heights neighborhood. On February 21, 1991, the building was added to the U.S. National Register of Historic Places. The structure is also included as an official contributing property within the Tampa Heights Historic District, which was declared a Historic District nationally by the United States Department of the Interior on August 4, 1995, and locally by the city of Tampa on September 7, 2000. Additionally, the building is one of only two churches to have been designated a Local Landmark Structure by the city of Tampa.

== Parish history ==
St. James House of Prayer is an active parish under the Tampa Deanery of the Episcopal Diocese of Southwest Florida, which is within Province 4 of the Episcopal Church in the United States of America, part of the worldwide Anglican Communion.

The congregation officially formed in 1997 through the merger of two long established congregations, St. James Episcopal Church and The House of Prayer Episcopal Church. The merger of the two was made after the former St. James Church property was chosen as the site for the new Blake High School. Meanwhile, The House of Prayer had lost their rector and parish status after a decline in membership. Joining the two congregations was mutually beneficial, matching the parishioners in need of a priest with the priest in need of a pulpit. The union resulted in full parish status being conferred upon the new St. James House of Prayer in 2001.

The original St. James Episcopal was organized in 1892 as an Anglican Episcopal Church for the city's black population. At that time, segregation was the norm, and many black Bahamian and Cuban immigrants were arriving in Tampa to work in the cigar industry. St. James Episcopal Church would go on to serve Tampa's African-American community for more than a century.

Nearly as old was Tampa's third white Episcopal church, the House of Prayer, founded in 1907. The church served the population of Tampa Heights, and by 1926 was named a parish by the local diocese. The House of Prayer went on to become one of Tampa's first racially integrated churches in the 1960s, but within the next decade much of its membership moved away as the Tampa Heights neighborhood had entered a period of serious decline. Efforts to reverse the downward trend in the neighborhood began in the 1990s, resulting in the establishment of the Tampa Heights Historic District at both the local and national levels.

== Church building ==
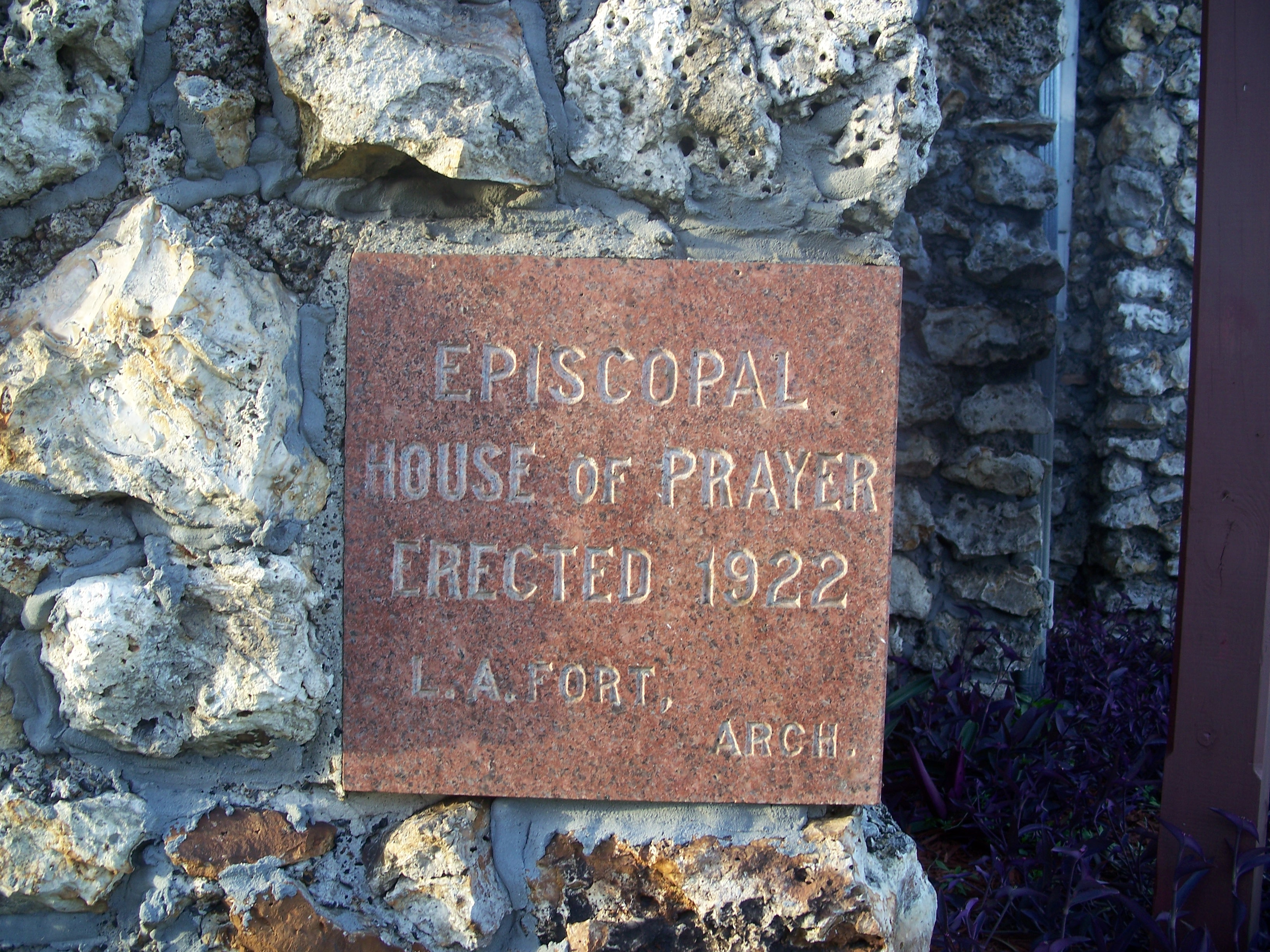
Building cornerstone

The historic church building was erected in 1922 and dedicated in February, 1923. The Reverend William C. Richardson, MD, a retired physician-turned-priest, personally spearheaded the construction of the church, even purchasing and donating the land. He selected architect Louis A. Fort to design the Gothic Revival church, including a tower, battlements, and stained glass windows. The church building is unique in its construction, with 16-inch-thick (410 mm) concrete walls on the interior, and exterior walls composed entirely of flint rock, stacked with mortar. The rocks were collected from the bottom of the Hillsborough River where it empties into the bay, however, the rocks did not occur there naturally. The rocks came from all around the world aboard the sailing ships of centuries past, and wound up in Tampa as the ships discarded ballast from their hulls. Because of the striking stonework exterior, the building is occasionally referred to as "The Rock Church."

The building's official listing with the National Register of Historic Places is under the name "Episcopal House of Prayer", since the historic status was determined prior to the merger of churches which created today's St. James House of Prayer Episcopal Church.

== See also ==
- Episcopal Diocese of Southwest Florida
- Tampa Heights Historic District
