= Secure Border Initiative =

American border security component

The Secure Border Initiative (SBI) is a program created by Secretary Chertoff of DHS to organize the four operating components of border security: Customs and Border Protection (CBP), Immigration and Customs Enforcement (ICE), U.S. Citizenship and Immigration Services (USCIS) and the U.S. Coast Guard (USCG).

SBI has 3 main operating goals:

1. Improve border security
2. increase interior enforcement of immigration and customs laws
3. Implement a Temporary Worker Program (TWP)

The prime contractor for SBI is Boeing. A major component of SBI is SBInet, a new, integrated system of personnel, infrastructure, technology, and rapid response, for the northern and southern land borders of the U.S., primarily through fencing and electronic surveillance. From September 2006 to January 2008, CBP, which runs SBInet, awarded $1.15 billion through eight task orders to Boeing for work on SBI and SBInet.
