= Columbus Drive =

Columbus Drive may refer to:

- Columbus Drive (Chicago)
- Columbus Drive (Tampa)
