= James W. Walter Sr. =

Home builder

James W. Walter Sr. (September 18, 1922 – January 6, 2000), of Tampa, Florida, United States, was a home builder who started Jim Walter Homes and Walter Industries, now doing business as Walter Energy, Inc., a leading producer of metallurgical coal for the global steel industry, in 1946 with $1,000 he borrowed from his father. Walter eventually sold the company in 1986 for $2 billion to Kohlberg Kravis Roberts (KKR).

Walter was the son of Ebe and Mabel Walter. The book Building a Business: The Jim Walter Story tells his story. His wife, Monica Walter, died in 1982, leaving two sons, James W. Walter Jr. and Robert Walter. The western section of what was known as Columbus Drive was renamed Jim Walter Boulevard in 2003.

== Jim Walter Homes ==
Jim Walter Homes were "shell" homes, meaning the company would complete the outside so that the house was watertight, then allow the customer to finish the inside with their own labor. The company would also sell most of the inside materials, including sheetrock, insulation, doors and carpet to the customer and include them in the purchase. The result was very affordable mortgage payments, usually for 20 years. The only requirement from the company was that the customer had owned the land on which the house was constructed, meaning that in the case of foreclosure the company got not only a (potentially never-finished) house but a building lot as well. During the late 1970s and early 1980s, when mortgage rates went as high as 15%, Jim Walter offered 10% financing with no money down.

In 1961 Walter bought Celotex using just stock in Jim Walter Homes. The Wall Street Journal wrote, "Jonah has just swallowed the whale."

In 1968, Walter bought US Pipe and Foundry. Later, Walter acquired Fry Roofing, Georgia Marble, and various other building material companies.

In 1988, Kohlberg Kravis Roberts acquired Jim Walter Corp. (later Walter Industries) for $3.3 billion in early 1988 but faced issues with the buyout almost immediately. Most notably, a subsidiary of Jim Walter Corp (Celotex) faced a large asbestos lawsuit and incurred liabilities that the courts ruled would need to be satisfied by the parent company. In 1989, the holding company that KKR used for the Jim Walter buyout filed for Chapter 11 bankruptcy protection.

Walter Industries, its parent, closed Jim Walter Homes in January 2009, just prior to the separation of its related financing business. Upon separation of Financing, Walter Industries, which in 2008 derived most of its revenues from its core natural resources and energy businesses, rebranded itself Walter Energy, reflecting its focus on these core businesses.
