= Project 28 =

Project 28 is the name given to a U.S. border protection program that runs along a 28-mile (45 km) stretch of the US/Mexican border in southern Arizona. The project, the first phase of a much larger program called the "Secure Border Initiative network" (SBInet), was scheduled to be completed in mid-2007, but did not become operational until late 2007. It involves the placement of 9 high-tech surveillance towers that monitor activity using radar, high-resolution cameras, and wireless networking, looking for incursions to report to the Border Patrol.

In February 2008, authorities said that the project did not work as planned nor did it meet the needs of the U.S. Border Patrol. As a result, the deployment of about 100 miles (160 km) of virtual fence near Tucson, Yuma, Arizona, and El Paso, Texas is now projected to be completed by the end of 2011, rather than 2008.

== Costs ==
In September 2006, Boeing won a contractor competition and was awarded a three-year, $67 million contract by the U.S. government to build and operate Project 28. The initial construction phase had an estimated cost of $20 million. Project 28 is the pilot for SBInet, which has a total estimated cost of two to eight billion dollars. If Project 28 is successful, hundreds of towers (an estimate in May 2007 was 850 towers) could be placed on the 6,000 miles (9,700 km) of the U.S. borders with Mexico and Canada. The Department of Homeland Security (DHS) estimates that the cost to secure each mile of the border with fencing is about $3 million, compared to about $1 million using technology such as that of Project 28.

In a report in February 2007, the Government Accountability Office said that Congress needed to keep a tight rein on the program, because, it said, "SBInet runs the risk of not delivering promised capabilities and benefits on time and within budget." Between 1998 and 2006, the U.S. government spent $429 million on border technology programs that failed.

== Technology ==
=== Components ===
The four primary components of the system are the sensor towers, the P28 "Common Operating Picture" (COP), enhanced communications, and upgraded agent vehicles which include a laptop computer and a satellite phone. The project also incorporates unattended ground sensors that will detect intrusions via magnetic, seismic and acoustic sensors and transmit information that will be distributed via the COP.

Each of the 98-foot (30 m)-high towers has radar (MSTAR), infrared cameras and other sensors, and data-processing and communications equipment to distribute information to control centers, mobile units, agent vehicles and other law enforcement employees.

=== Operations ===
When migrants cross the SBInet's virtual fence, camera and other sensors on the tower are to instantly detect the incursion. These towers then relay real-time electronic images to a private sector communications center. There, a contractor employee will take manual command of the camera, zooming in to identify the number of individuals and their means of transport. After classifying the "threat," the employee will electronically transfer the entrants' coordinates to Border Patrol agents via laptop computers mounted inside Border Patrol vehicles.

=== Limitations of Project 28 ===
Rather than develop new technology, Boeing took existing cameras, sensors, radar and other equipment and bundled them into a system that although not technologically novel is unlike anything the Border Patrol had used.

Boeing, as the prime contractor, selected nearly 100 of the 900 subcontractors that applied to work on the contract. While Boeing considers the list of subcontractors to be an industrial secret, known subcontractors include Booz Allen Hamilton; Centech, DRS Technologies; Kollsman, Inc.; LGS, L-3 Communications Government Services; Perot Systems, Pinkerton Government Services; Power Contracting, Inc. Reconnaissance Group; Sandia National Laboratories; the Texas Transportation Institute at Texas A&M University; and Unisys.

As of early June 2007, Boeing had issued 55 requests for proposal for additional technologies to be deployed along the border. Jerry McElwee, a Boeing vice president and the program manager for SBInet, said that the June 2007 version of Project 28 was "a demonstration of our approach and a test bed for incorporating improvements" to SBInet.

== Test area ==
=== Selection ===
The area where the project is located was the busiest in the sector in fiscal year 2006, according to Border Patrol officials. "We chose the most difficult, highest-trafficked piece of Arizona because we wanted to take on the challenges that we would have to take on someday," said Brian Seagrave, vice president for border security at Unisys Corporation, the company that is providing the information systems expertise. It also includes a Port of Entry (POE) and is representative of terrain conditions found in large areas along the Southwest border. Unlike other areas on the border that have stadium lighting, fencing and cameras on 40-foot (12 m) towers, this area lacks infrastructure and technology.

=== Location of towers ===
The nine towers are located on either side of Sasabe, Arizona. Two of the towers are on the land of Tohono O'odham Nation west of the Baboquivari range, three are in the Buenos Aires National Wildlife Refuge, and one is located just outside Arivaca, Arizona, 11 miles (18 km) north of the border.

The initial towers are redeployable; at the end of the Project 28 trial, DHS will decide whether to change any locations. The towers will then be moved to the next area being tested, and will be replaced by permanent towers.

Residents of Arivaca who objected to the tower near their town were told in a meeting in May 2007 that the tower was located there because mountains to the south hindered surveillance, and the tower's closer proximity to the roads near the town would make it easier to maintain. In June 2007, with the system scheduled to become operational shortly, residents were concerned about being under 24-hour surveillance, bright lights in the night sky, and the disruption of recreation and other activities near the tower, including loud alarm blasts from the towers scaring horses on trail rides.

=== Organizational placement ===
The 28 miles (45 km) of the border near Sasabe that are in Project 28 are the responsibility of the Tucson station of the Border Patrol. The station was arresting 200 to 400 illegal aliens per day as of early 2008.

== Progress of the project ==
=== Initial testing ===
In early April 2007, Boeing announced that it had successfully tested the first integrated mobile sensor tower. Dr. Kirk Evans, the SBInet program manager at CBP, said that "The tower and its components functioned as expected, and we are confident that the design is repeatable for deployment along the border."

The project was originally scheduled to be operational on June 13, 2007. System testing began in the first week of June. Agency officials testified publicly on June 7 that Project 28 was on schedule.

=== Delayed implementation ===
On June 8, agency officials said that project completion would be delayed until June 20. On June 16, the department said that the project would be delayed beyond June 20.

On June 26, a DHS spokesman could not say when the project would become operational. "We are working hard to resolve these challenges as quickly as possible so that we can deploy or make this system operational and give the agents the tools they need to better secure the border," he said. In mid-July, a DHS spokesman said that programmers were working overtime to make sure the radars, cameras and sensors properly send information to computers in the two command centers and to laptops in Border Patrol vehicles. Boeing is "getting close" but no date has been set for the system to become operational, the spokesman said.

In early September, a spokesman at the Customs and Border Patrol said "It could be two, four, six or eight weeks until it’s operating." Boeing and DHS encountered problems integrating the various cameras, radars and other sensors on the nine towers, and there were also problems combining the incoming data seamlessly with communications networks. Several days later, DHS Secretary Michael Chertoff said he expected to testing to begin in October.

In late October, a senior Boeing official testified that the system was substantially improved. The official said that ""The system is consistently able to slew to new radar targets and successfully record people crossing the border," and that "Camera elevation difficulties have been fixed and a solution for radar display delays has been implemented."

=== Reduced operational testing ===
As a pilot project for SBInet, Project 28 was originally scheduled to be operational for eight months. However, in September 2007, DHS Secretary Michael Chertoff said he expected operational testing to finish by the end of the year, a period of less than three months, assuming that the system did go "live" sometime in October.

=== Acceptance of first phase ===
In early December 2007, Homeland Security Department conditionally accepted the delivery of the first phase of Project 28 and awarded Boeing a $64 million contract for the next phase. Part of the next phase involves upgrading the Common Operating Picture (COP) system to display real-time information from the radars, cameras and ground sensors that were installed along the borders. The Border Patrol was to take over Project 28 and run it in an operational mode for 45 days. During that time, Chertoff said that "we will identify further adjustments or fixes that need to be made."

DHS officially accepted the system on February 22, 2008.

== Effectiveness ==
In February 2008, U.S. Representative Chris Carney, chairman of the House Homeland Security Committee's Management, Investigations and Oversight Subcommittee, said the system "works about 30 percent of the time". During a visit in early January 2008 to El Paso, Carney said that he saw an incident where two illegal immigrants crossed in front of a project camera. Carney said that a technician tried to electronically reposition the camera to track them, but the picture was out of focus, the camera moved too slowly, and the illegal immigrants got away.
