= Jimmy Walter =

American venture capitalist and author (born 1947)

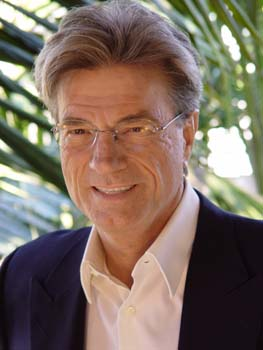
Jimmy Walter

James W. Walter Jr. (born 1947) is an American venture capitalist and author. He is best known for sponsoring advertisements asking to reopen the investigation of the September 11, 2001 attacks and offering financial rewards to anyone that could prove the World Trade Center was destroyed without the use of explosives.

== Biography ==
Walter is the older of two sons of James W. Walter Sr., a Tampa, Florida home builder and industrialist. He excelled at math and science in school, completing high school at the Asheville School in North Carolina, and was offered a Morehead scholarship to the University of North Carolina, but turned it down at his father's urging in order to enter business school.

Walter earned a B.S. in Business Administration from the University of North Carolina in 1969, and worked in his father's business for two years. His father's political influence helped Walter join the Air Force Reserves to stay out of active combat in the Vietnam War; he earned an officer's commission and served for four years.

After leaving Walter Industries, Walter lived in New York City, Hong Kong, and Tampa. He worked in a number of jobs and industries, including financial public relations in New York City, and founded several corporations.

On May 28, 1991, Walter and Jack Edwards co-wrote Banzai, You Bastards (ISBN 028563027X), the story of Edwards's abuse in a Japanese World War II prisoner-of-war camp.

When his father died in January 2000, Walter inherited a fortune reported between $7–14.3 million; he says $11 million. Much of that has been spent on his campaigns. He no longer receives a salary, but receives income from investments.

Since January 2005, Walter has been living in self-imposed exile in Vienna, Austria, after being attacked and threatened due to his campaign.

== Non-profit organizations ==
In the early 1990s, Walter used outside funding and US$3 million of his own money to found the Life Skills Foundation, an organization that taught skills and goal setting to Florida prison inmates. The project produced results, but was shut down after the governor cut state financial backing.

Walter is also the founder of "Walden Three", a non-profit educational foundation in Santa Barbara, California that researches ideas for sustainable, environmentally friendly urban development. The foundation has developed a computer model for the ideal sustainable living, carfree and fossil fuel-free city or society that produces almost all of the consumables, durable goods, structures, mass transportation and social security needed by its citizens. The model uses rational-emotive therapy (REBT), developed by Dr. Albert Ellis. Walter considers Walden Three his "day job" when he is not involved with campaigning.

== Anti-war campaign ==
Walter had been opposed to the Vietnam War, a source of contention with his father, but had not used his money to act on his convictions. On February 27, 2003, Walter spent US$125,000 to take out a full-page advertisement in the New York Times attacking Secretary of State Colin Powell's justification for the impending 2003 invasion of Iraq. It was headlined "Powell Lied?" describing Powell's February 5, 2003 speech to the United Nations Security Council—the New York Times insisted on adding the question mark. Walter took out similar advertisements in English and Spanish in local newspapers in Santa Barbara, California, where he was living. His stance was unpopular; posters he attached to his house were torn down, and a rock was put through his car's window. Walter did not repeat the advertisement.

Walter also created a "Chicken-Hawk-In-Chief" design mocking George W. Bush which he put on t-shirts, sweatshirts, and a full costume. In May 2004, a Williamstown, Vermont middle school student gained national attention when he wore the t-shirt and was required to cover parts of the design depicting Bush drinking and snorting cocaine. On August 30, 2006, the U.S. Second Circuit Court of Appeals ruled the school was wrong to censor the shirt, and on June 29, 2007, the US Supreme Court rejected an appeal, allowing that ruling to stand.

== Reopen 9/11 campaign ==
Walter began a series of advertisements about the September 11, 2001 attacks in October 2004, which included full-page ads in the New York Times and Wall Street Journal, and 30 second cable television spots on CNN, Fox News, and ESPN. They implied that no plane flew into The Pentagon, and that 7 World Trade Center was brought down by internal explosives. They called for a new investigation into what happened on September 11, and referred viewers to the website reopen911.org. In conjunction with the campaign, Walter sponsored an October 2004 Zogby poll, which found that 66% of New York City residents wanted a fuller investigation of the events of September 11.

Walter's theory is that the hijacked planes were replaced by remote controlled drones that were crashed into the World Trade Center and Pentagon, while the buildings were brought down by preset explosives, to create a pretext for the war in Afghanistan and 2003 invasion of Iraq. At the web site, Walter offered a US$10,000 reward for a mathematical proof of how the World Trade Center buildings collapsed from the fire and impact, the way the 9/11 Commission said. By 2005, the reward had grown to $1,000,000 for proof that explosives were not used in the collapse of the World Trade Center.

On November 10, and November 11, 2004, Walter appeared on CNN's Anderson Cooper 360°, where he debated journalist Gerald Posner about the claims made by the campaign. On May 9, 2005, Walter was featured on the "Conspiracy Theories" episode of Showtime cable television program Penn & Teller: Bullshit!,

As of December 2004, Walter estimated the total cost of the campaign at more than $3 million; by December 2005 it rose to $5.5 million.

In May 2005, Walter financed European tours of speaking engagements for William Rodriguez and his lawyer in the Rodriguez v. Bush lawsuit, Philip Berg. Rodriguez claims that he saved hundreds of people in the World Trade Center who were trapped behind locked fire escape doors.

In 2006, Walter traveled to Malaysia with Rodriguez, appearing at a conference with Michael Collins Piper. Rodriguez and Walter also traveled to Venezuela.

=== Confronting the Evidence ===
Walter produced a video documentary called Confronting the Evidence in 2005 and distributed over 300,000 free copies on DVD, including one to every household in Tony Blair's Sedgefield constituency. Confronting the Evidence was broadcast on Italian Rai Tre television on September 24, 2006, at 9:00 p.m., during the Report program.
