= Benjamin Chertoff =

American journalist

Benjamin Chertoff is a journalist, photographer and video producer. He is most known for his work on the Popular Mechanics article "9/11: Debunking The Myths". He also created the Popular Mechanics Show, the weekly podcast of Popular Mechanics magazine. He is currently a freelance photojournalist, writer and documentary producer.

== Biography ==
Benjamin Chertoff is a magazine and photo / video journalist. He began his career at the age of 19, working as an intern in the features department at Time Out New York Magazine—including researching the magazine's Urban Legends story—and later contributing to the features section. Along with freelancing for several national magazines, he then worked at Men's Journal. In 2003 he helped start the political non-profit Music for America. He moved to Popular Mechanics in September, 2004. There, he worked as the magazine's research editor, and helped to manage the reporting for magazine's March, 2005 9/11: Debunking The Myths story, as well as the magazine's coverage of the aftermath to Hurricane Katrina, and many other aviation, military and technology stories. He held the position of Online Editor of Popular Mechanics, and edited all the digital outlets of Popular Mechanics Magazine.

The magazine's investigation of 9/11 conspiracy theories was the first of its kind. Chertoff has stated that the magazine's editors decided to investigate 9/11 Myths after seeing Jimmy Walter's full-page ad in The New York Times for a book called Painful Questions. In a June, 2006 column in Scientific American magazine, Skeptics Society president Dr. Michael Shermer called the Popular Mechanics article "the single best debunking of this conspiratorial codswallop." In 2006, the magazine published the book Debunking 9/11 Myths: Why Conspiracy Theories Can't Stand Up to the Facts, which greatly expanded on the original story, including new myths and much more detail than could fit in the original, magazine article.

In 2007, Benjamin Chertoff left Popular Mechanics and began producing video and audio content for AOL's Switched.com, among other verticals. He currently lives in New York City, where he is a freelance photojournalist, photographer and documentary video producer.

== Disputed family background ==
Proponents of the 9/11 conspiracy theories have claimed that one of the researchers at Popular Mechanics, Benjamin Chertoff is the cousin of former Department of Homeland Security secretary Michael Chertoff because they share the same last name. However, Chertoff has repeatedly denied this claim, most notably in the September 11, 2006 issue of U.S. News & World Report, stating "no one in my family has ever met anyone related to Michael Chertoff". In an audio interview, he noted that any possible relationship would likely only be found in "19th-century Belarus", and that his mother has described any such possible relationship as "distant".

== Coverage ==
He has been referred to by Coast to Coast AM, a Washington Post blog, CNN, and ABC News.
