= Chertov =

Chertov, Chortov or Chertoff (Russian: Чертов) is a Russian masculine surname originating from the word chort, meaning devil, demon. Its feminine counterpart is Chertova or Chortova. The surname may refer to the following notable people:

- Benjamin Chertoff, American journalist, photographer and video producer
- Daniil Chertov (born 1990), Russian professional football player
- Michael Chertoff (born 1953), American attorney
- Rick Chertoff (born 1950), American music producer

== See also ==
- Chertov Ovrag, an archaeological site on Wrangel Island, Russia
