= Debunking 9/11 Myths =

2006 book

Debunking 9/11 Myths: Why Conspiracy Theories Can't Stand Up to the Facts
- The front book cover art of Debunking 9/11 Myths.
- Editors: David Dunbar; Brad Reagan
- Original title: 9/11: Debunking the Myths
- Language: English
- Subject: 9/11 conspiracy theories / September 11 attacks / Terrorism
- Genre: Non-fiction / History / Terrorism
- Publisher: Hearst Communications, Inc.
- Publication date: August 15, 2006
- Publication place: United States
- English publication date: August 15, 2006
- ISBN: 1-58816-635-X
- Website: http://www.origin.popularmechanics.com/blogs/911myths/

Debunking 9/11 Myths: Why Conspiracy Theories Can't Stand Up to the Facts is a non-fiction book published by Hearst Communications, Inc. on August 15, 2006. The book is based on the article "9/11: Debunking the Myths" in the March 2005 issue of Popular Mechanics and is written by David Dunbar and Brad Reagan, responding to various 9/11 conspiracy theories. The authors interviewed over 300 sources for the book, relying on expert and witness accounts.

== Original article ==
The front magazine cover art of Popular Mechanics' March 2005 issue, displaying the article's title.

"9/11: Debunking the Myths" was the original article in the March 2005 issue of Popular Mechanics, on which the book was based. It also attempted to debunk the various 9/11 conspiracy theories. The magazine cover referred to the article as "Debunking 9/11 Lies, Conspiracy Theories Can't Stand Up to the Hard Facts." The online version's title was later changed to "Debunking the 9/11 Myths: Special Report." The original reporting team included Benjamin Chertoff, Davin Coburn, Michael Connery, David Enders, Kevin Haynes, Kristin Roth, Tracy Saelinger, Erik Sofge and the editors of Popular Mechanics.

The article (available at: https://www.popularmechanics.com/technology/military/news/1227842) has been referred to by publications and organizations such as the Chicago Tribune, the San Francisco Bay Guardian, and the Bureau of International Information Programs.

== Coverage of the book ==
Debunking 9/11 Myths has been referred to by news sources such as the San Francisco Chronicle and The Courier-Mail.

On the fifth anniversary of the attacks, Democracy Now! screened a debate between Dunbar and James B. Meigs from Popular Mechanics and Dylan Avery and Jason Bermas, respectively the director and producer/researcher of the 9/11 online-documentary Loose Change. Popular Mechanics responded to early criticisms of their book on October 13, 2006.

The History Channel featured interviews with the editors of Popular Mechanics in an August 2007 90-minute special which debunked a number of the conspiracy theories. Entitled 9/11 Conspiracies: Fact or Fiction, the program contained interviews with several 9/11 conspiracy theorists and repeatedly referred to the Popular Mechanics book as a reference.

== Benjamin Chertoff ==
Proponents of the 9/11 conspiracy theories have claimed that one of the researchers at Popular Mechanics, Benjamin Chertoff is the cousin of former Department of Homeland Security secretary Michael Chertoff because they share the same last name. However, Chertoff has repeatedly denied this claim, most notably in the September 11, 2006, issue of U.S. News & World Report, stating "No one in my family has ever met anyone related to Michael Chertoff". In an audio interview, he noted that any possible relationship would likely only be found in "19th-century Belarus", and that his mother has described any such possible relationship as "distant".
