= Lee Elementary School of Technology / World Studies =

Coordinates: 27°58′0″N 82°27′27″W

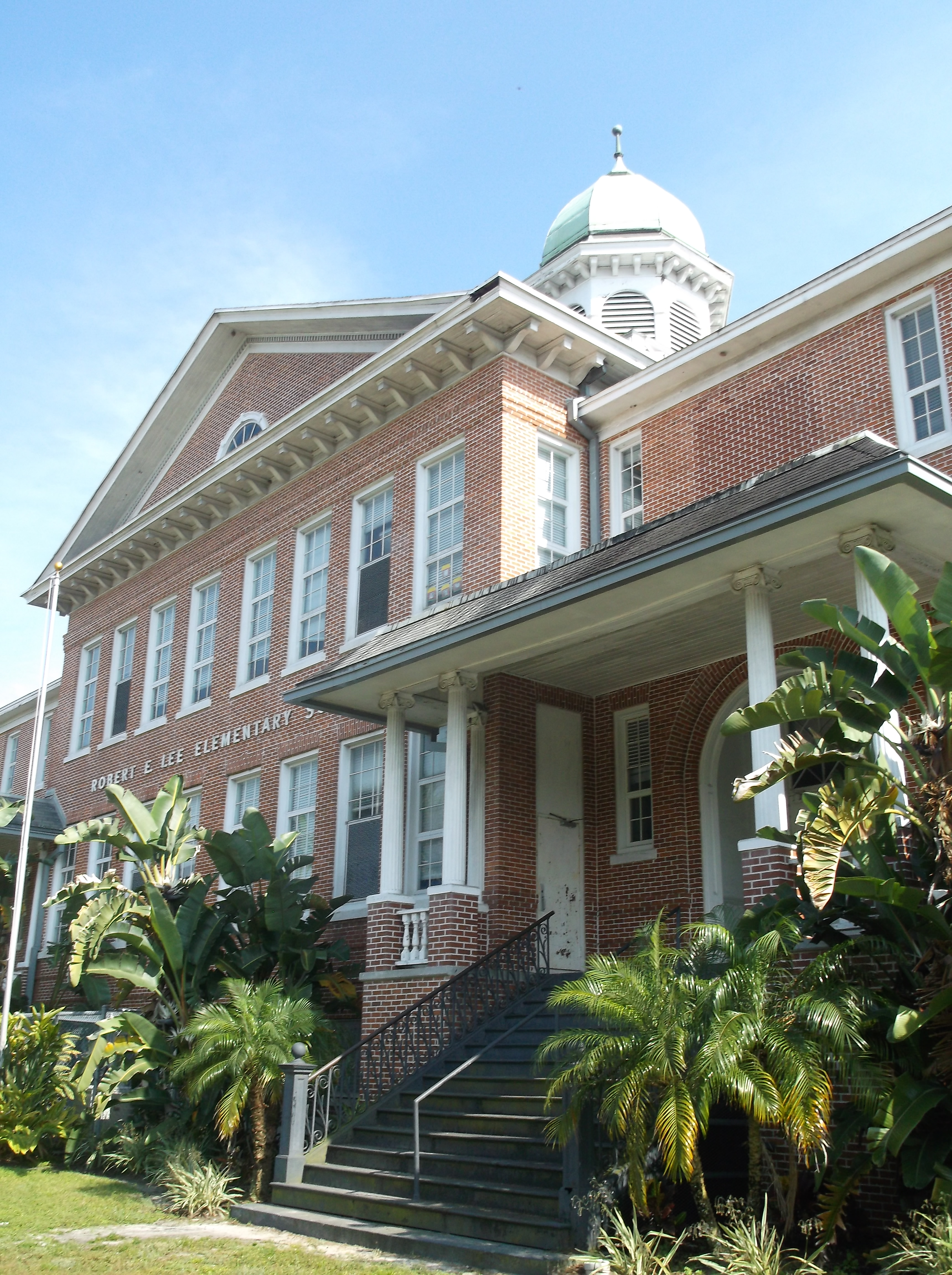
Lee Elementary School of Technology/World Studies on Columbus Avenue in Tampa, Florida

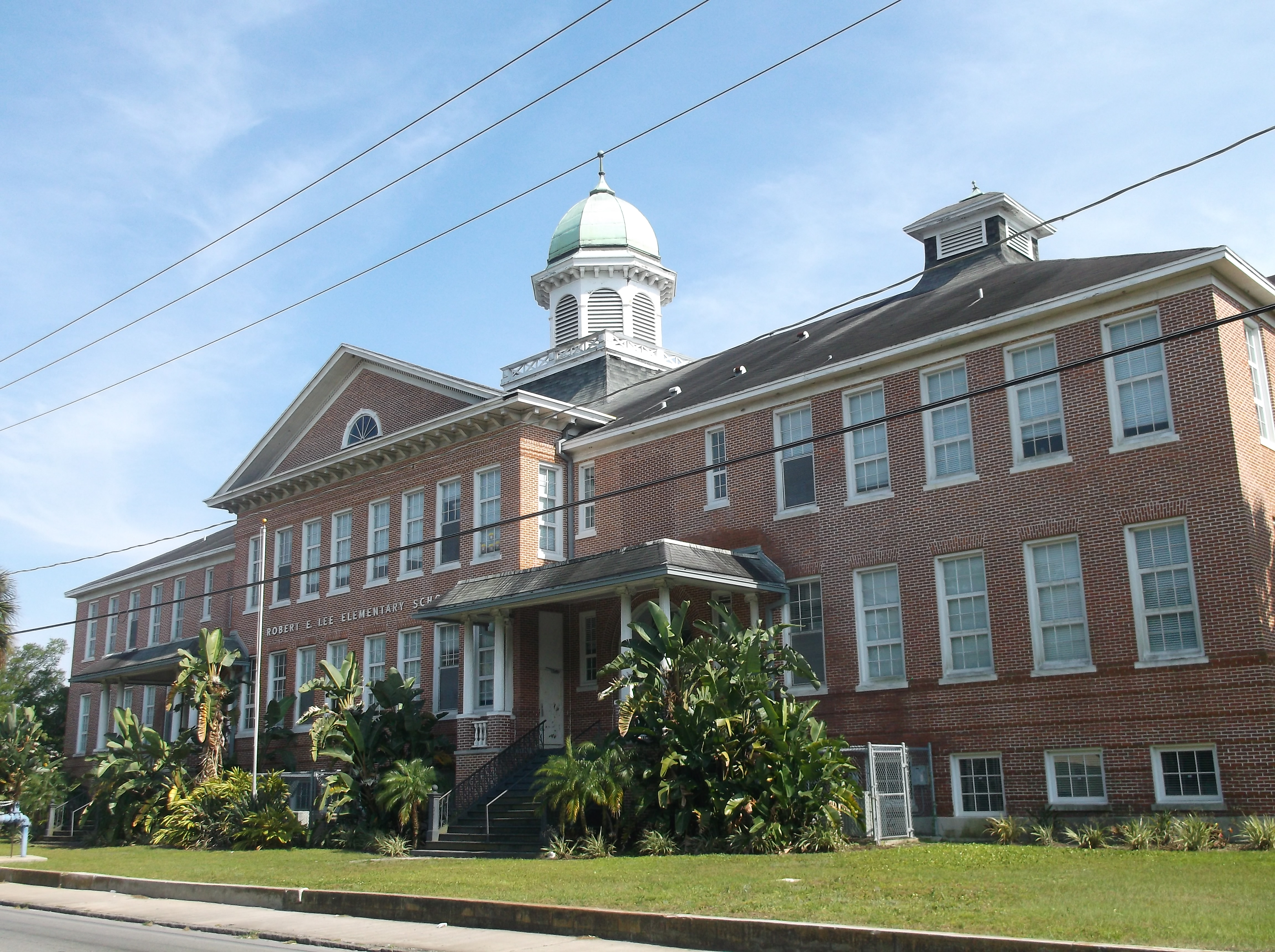
Lee Elementary School of Technology/World Studies in Tampa, Florida

Lee Elementary School of Technology/ World Studies was a historic elementary school in Tampa, Florida. It was established as Michigan Avenue Grammar School in 1906. It became Robert E. Lee Elementary School in 1943 when Michigan Avenue was renamed Columbus Drive (Tampa). The school was located at 305 East Columbus Drive and was the first brick school building constructed in Hillsborough County, Florida. In 2004, it became Lee Elementary School of Technology/World Studies. The school's colors are royal blue and gold and its mascot is Robert E. Lee's horse Traveller.

The school was renovated in 1989 and won a local historic preservation award. It reopened as Lee Elementary School, the first magnet school in Hillsborough County. In 2005, it became Lee Elementary School of Technology/World Studies with its curriculum expanded to include a world studies.

In July, 2015, children spoke before the district school board, asking that the school's name be change because it was offensive. Hillsborough County School District Board members did not discuss the issue. Amid ongoing controversy, in June, 2017, board member Tamara Shamburger asked the board to consider the name change while a man wearing a Confederate uniform stood silently observing the meeting.

On September 12, 2017, the school caught fire shortly after power was restored to the area. The school had been closed, along with all other schools in Hillsborough County, due to Hurricane Irma. The flames began in the central section of the building on the second floor and spread quickly. It is unclear as to what caused the fire, but because the power had been out in the area following Hurricane Irma, it is possible that the fire began due to electrical issues that were previously undetected and not due to arson. At this point, the building appears to be a total loss. Students, faculty, and staff will spend the remainder of the 2017/18 school year and all of the 2018/19 school year on the campus of nearby Lockhart Elementary Magnet School.

On October 16, 2018, the Hillsborough County School Board voted unanimously to have the school rebuilt, using the preserved surviving exterior.

Reconstruction started in December 2019 and the school reopened in January 2021 as Tampa Heights Elementary School.
