= AUT Law School =

Coordinates: 36°51′12.66″S 174°45′51.68″E

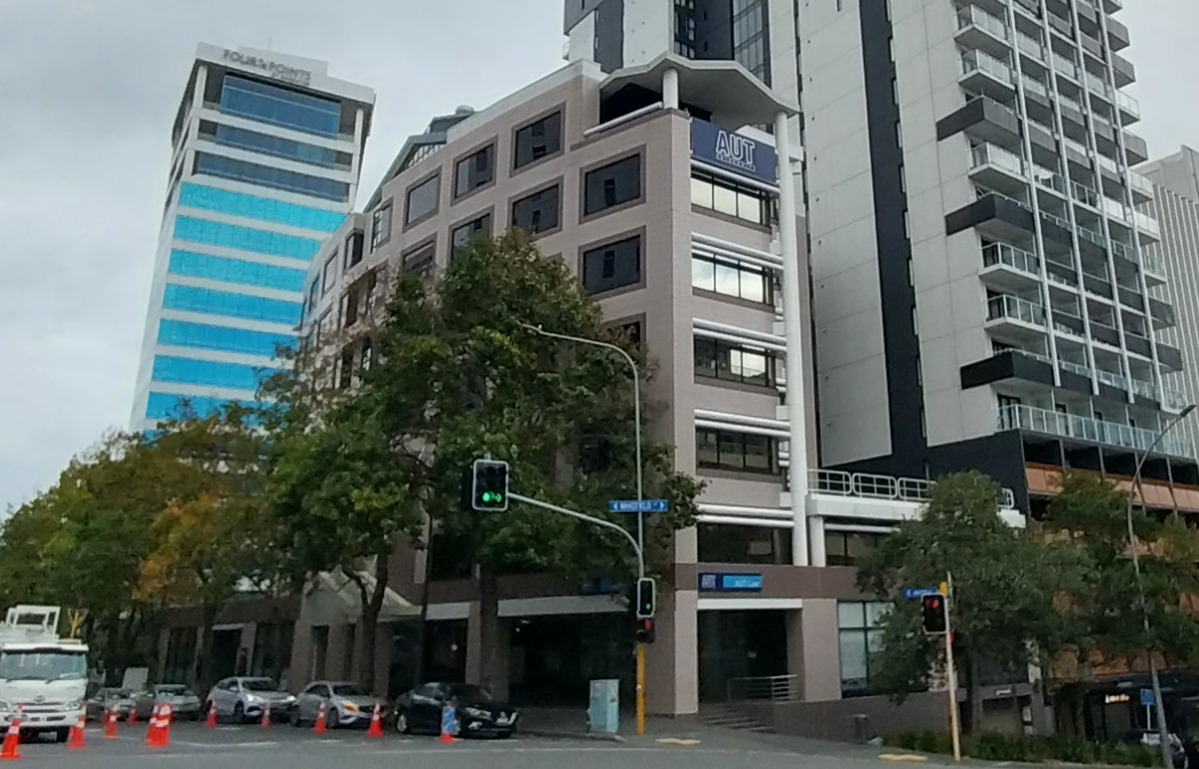
AUT Law School

The AUT Law School is a school of Auckland University of Technology in Auckland, New Zealand.

The law school is a part of the Faculty of Business, Economics and Law and is one of three schools in the faculty. It offers two undergraduate, and five postgraduate programs to students. Established in 2009, the Bachelor of Laws (LL.B) and the Bachelor of Laws (Honours) (LL.B(Hons.)) have been developed with consultation of external key partners in legal education. The Law School also produces a newsletter AUTLaw for interested parties.

== Deans of Law ==
The current Interim Dean of Law is Associate Professor Khylee Quince.
