= Columbus Drive (Tampa) =

Road in Tampa, Florida, US

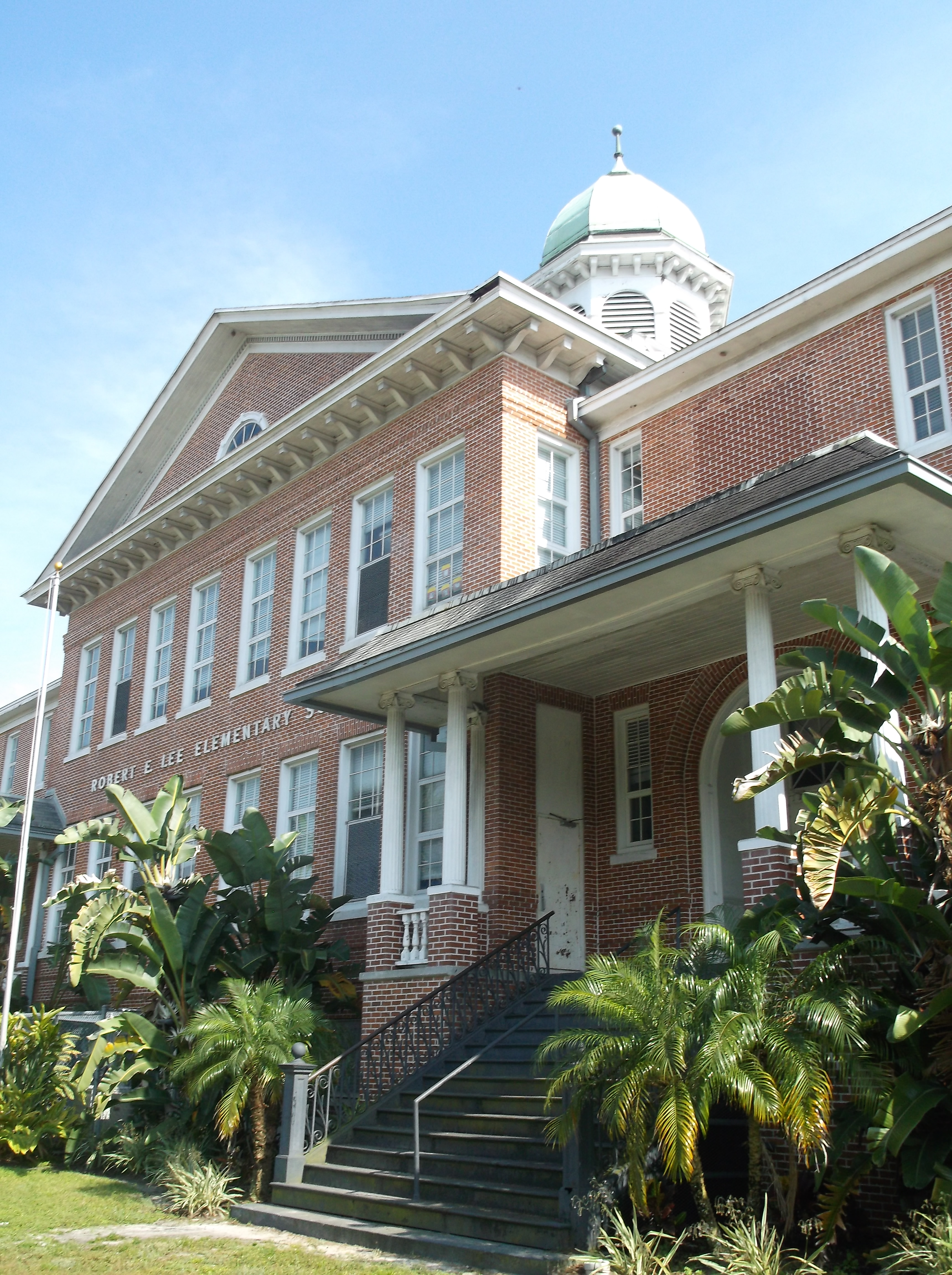
Lee Elementary School of Technology/World Studies on Columbus Drive in Tampa, Florida

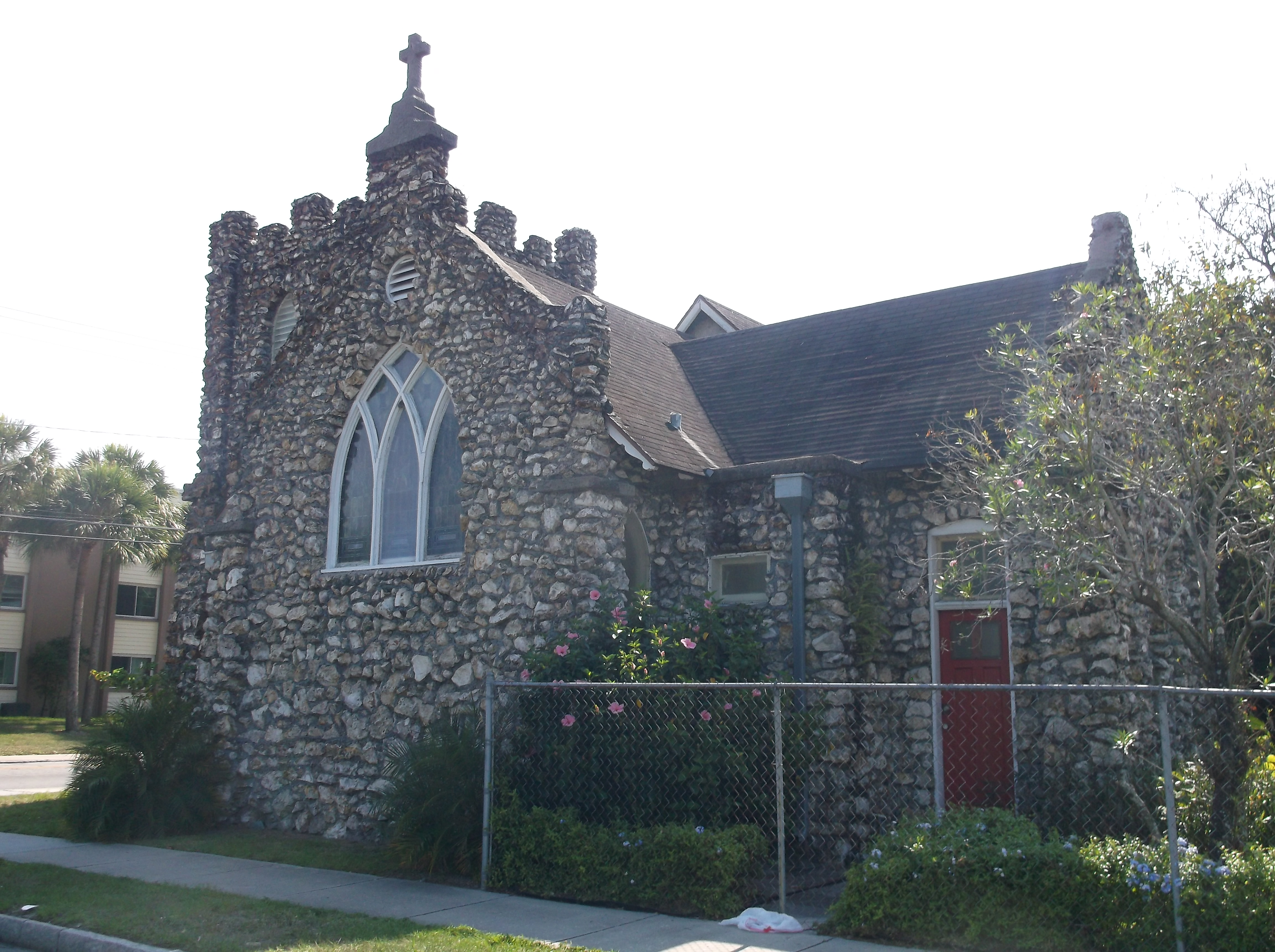
St. James House of Prayer Episcopal Church

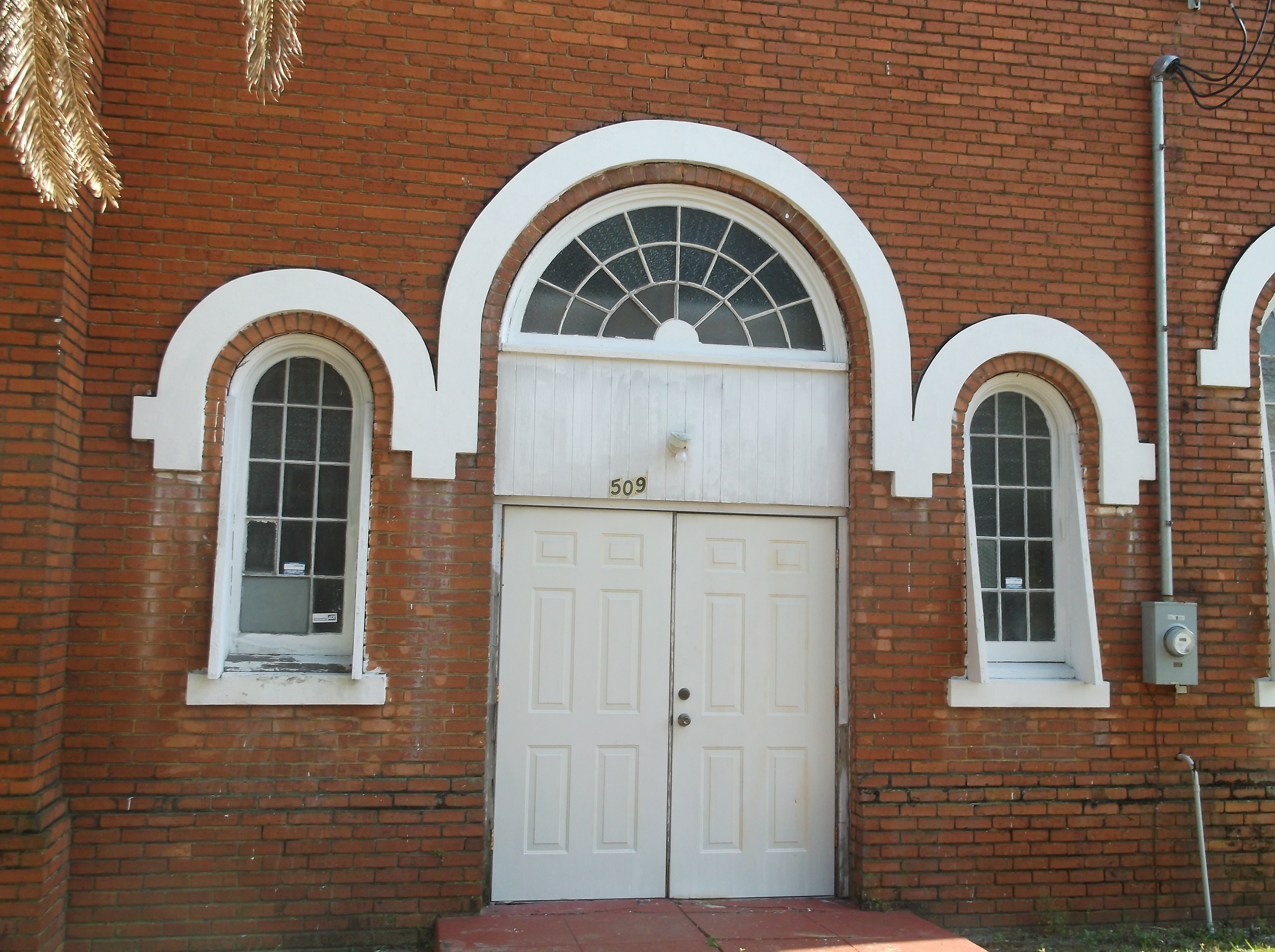
Bethel Primitive Baptist Church on Columbus Drive in Tampa, Florida 2014 entrance

Columbus Drive is a major road in Tampa, Florida, from State Road 589 on its west side east through West Tampa. It was originally known as Michigan Avenue and was renamed Columbus Drive in 1933. On its west end, International Plaza, an upscale mall, and several upscale restaurants are located off Columbus Drive on Jim Walter Boulevard, named in 2003 for Jim Walter. East on Columbus there are several Latin markets and eateries including La Teresita and Arco Iris. Columbus Drive crosses the Hillsborough River via the Columbus Drive Bridge.

East Columbus Drive travels through a historic area of Tampa, Tampa Heights. Latin food restaurants on East Columbus Drive include Arco-Iris and Brocato's Sandwich Shop. The area is a center of Latin culture in Tampa. The Michigan Avenue grammar school opened in 1907 and became Robert E. Lee Elementary School in 1933. and is located at 305 East Columbus Drive between Jefferson Street and Morgan Street. It is Hillsborough County, Florida's oldest brick school building. The Villa Madonna School was established at 315 West Columbus Drive.

A historic marker commemorating "Buffalo Soldiers" is located at Central Avenue and Columbus Drive. The all-black regiment settled in Tampa Heights during the Spanish–American War.
