= African Journal of International and Comparative Law =

- Discipline: International law, Comparative law
- Language: English, French

Publication details
- History: 1993–present
- Publisher: Edinburgh University Press (United Kingdom)
- Frequency: Biannual

Standard abbreviations
- ISO 4: Afr. J. Int. Comp. Law

Indexing
- ISSN: 0954-8890 (print); 1755-1609 (web)
- OCLC no.: 20297647

Links
- Journal homepage

The African Journal of International and Comparative Law is published twice yearly by the Edinburgh University Press in March and September. The journal publishes refereed articles in international and comparative law on a pan-African basis. Articles cover public and private international law and each issue includes a section on recent developments relevant to the continent. The majority of articles are in English with articles in French also published. After a break in publication, the journal was restarted with Edinburgh University Press in 2005, with the approval of the original publishers, the African Society of International and Comparative Law.

== Editors ==
The journal is edited by Rachel Murray (University of Bristol) and Kofi Oteng Kufuor (University of East London).
