= William Rodriguez =

American 9/11 survivor

- William Rodriguez at American Scholars Symposium: 9/11 and the NeoCon Agenda in Los Angeles, California, June 24–25, 2006
- Born: Puerto Rico

William Rodríguez is a former janitor at the North Tower of the World Trade Center during the September 11, 2001, attacks and was in the basement of the North Tower when American Airlines Flight 11 crashed into the building. After the attacks he received several awards for heroism for helping in the evacuation of many survivors. The Birmingham Mail said about Rodriguez: "He bravely led firefighters up the stairs, unlocking doors as they climbed and helping hundreds of survivors" and The Lancashire Telegraph added: "He then went back into the building in a bid to rescue his friends at the top of the tower, on the 106th floor. But he kept finding others who needed his help as well."

Rodriguez became prominent in the Latino community for helping to institute an economic amnesty program for victims of 9/11 who were undocumented workers.

Subsequently, Rodriguez traveled around talking about a theory and his experiences on 9/11, giving motivational lectures and discussing disaster management. The Herald newspaper of Glasgow characterized him as "the poster boy for a movement currently sweeping the globe... the 9/11 Truth Campaign." He titled his website "911keymaster", appearing on TV and having himself photographed frequently with a 'master key' to the World Trade Center, which, he has alleged on BBC and Dutch TV and C-SPAN, saved hundreds of lives. He also used the title "Last Man Out", touring in the UK and the US with that phrase. Rodriguez has also employed the "Last Survivor of the World Trade Center" slogan. Newspapers articles state that he raised 122 million dollars for the victims of 9/11.

== Biography ==
=== Magician's assistant ===
As a young man, Rodriguez worked under the stage name "Roudy" as an assistant to magician James Randi. A December 2005 article published on the Internet claimed that Rodriguez was adroit at insinuating himself into the good graces of Randi's targets and eliciting incriminating information, and that he had previously been featured on television in Puerto Rico escaping from a chained straitjacket while hanging from a burning rope.

=== WTC janitor ===
Rodriguez moved to New York from Puerto Rico and, according to the Internet article linked above, he "found himself a small fish in the big pond of New York magicians." He took a day job as a custodian at the World Trade Center. The article goes on to say that Rodriguez's show business aspirations fell by the wayside when his responsibilities for cleaning the office of Governor Mario Cuomo at the WTC expanded to include organizing Governor Cuomo's press conferences, and that after Cuomo left office in 1994, Rodriguez was reassigned to cleaning the windowless emergency staircases of the North Tower, where he remained until September 11, 2001.

=== September 11 attacks ===
Rodriguez said he usually clocked in at 8:00 a.m. and rode an elevator to the 106th floor, where Hispanic employees of the Windows on the World restaurant fed him a free breakfast. However, on the morning of September 11, 2001, Rodriguez was half an hour late and so reported directly to a basement office of his employer, American Building Maintenance. On September 11, Rodriguez told CNN that shortly before the plane hit the tower he was in the basement when:

...we hear like a big rumble. Not like an impact, like a rumble, like moving furniture in a massive way. And all of sudden we hear another rumble, and a guy comes running, running into our office, and all of skin was off his body. All of the skin. We went crazy, we started screaming, we told him to get out. We took everybody out of the office outside to the loading dock area.

Rodriguez's early accounts repeatedly mentioned a large fireball that shot down the elevator shafts and exploded through the doors, causing serious burn injuries to a man who happened to be standing in front of one of the freight elevator doors. This was consistent with similar reports by numerous other witnesses who saw fireballs erupting and blowing out elevator doors and burning people. In September 2002, Rodriguez said in a CNN interview:

...and at that terrible day when I took people out of the office, one of them totally burned because he was standing in front of the freight elevator and the ball of fire came down the duct of the elevator itself, I put him on the ambulance.

He did not identify the name of the victim in this interview, but he did identify the name of the victim as Felipe David (a native of Honduras, working for the American catering company Aramark) in several other interviews. David was released after spending 10 weeks recovering in the hospital; first in the New York Weill Cornell Medical Center burn unit, and then in Mount Sinai Medical Center's rehab program. He had suffered third degree burns covering 40% of his upper body while escaping from the basement of 1 World Trade Center.

The fire, the ball of fire, for example, I was in the basement when the first plane hit the building. And at that moment, I thought it was an electrical generator that blew up at that moment. A person comes running into the office saying 'explosion, explosion, explosion.' When I look at this guy; has all his skin pulled off of his body. Hanging from the top of his fingertips like it was a glove. And I said, what happened? He said the elevators. What happened was the ball of fire went down with such a force down the elevator shaft on the 58th (50A) – freight elevator, the biggest freight elevator that we have in the North Tower, it went out with such a force that it broke the cables. It went down, I think seven flights. The person survived because he was pulled from the B3 level. But this person, being in front of the doors waiting for the elevator, practically got his skin vaporized."

At that same NIST meeting, however, Rodriguez told investigators that he was "the last survivor pulled from the rubble". In fact, there were at least 18 survivors pulled from the rubble of the North Tower long after Rodriguez walked out of the building unharmed. The last survivor was Genelle Guzman-McMillan, who was rescued some 26 hours later at approximately 12:30 p.m. on September 12, 2001.

By August 17, 2007, after more than two years of telling his story to enthralled audiences, he told C-SPAN:

All of a sudden at 8:46... we hear 'BOOM!' An explosion so powerful and so loud that (it) pushed us upward in the air, coming from below! It was so powerful that all the walls cracked, the false ceiling fell on top of us, the fire sprinkler system got activated and everybody started screaming in horror: 'Help, help, help!'

He stated that he used a master key to let people out from behind locked emergency exit doors, saving hundreds of people, and that he turned down Hollywood movie deals worth millions and book contracts "from every publisher" because he "wanted to maintain [his] integrity."

Rodriguez also claimed to have seen hijacker Mohand al-Shehri scoping out the building prior to the attacks, in June 2001. A Daily News article says he told the FBI and the 9/11 Commission that he recognized the man after a brief, chance encounter months prior to the terrorist attacks. "It is believed that American Airlines Flight 11 hijacker Mohamed Atta cased New York City targets, including the Diamond District, but Rodriguez may have given the 9/11 panel the first eyewitness testimony about a hijacker inside one of the towers before the terror strike."

Rodriguez gave evidence to the 9/11 Commission. As was the case with the vast majority of the more than 1200 witnesses who gave evidence to the Commission, Rodriguez's evidence was not given in public and was not specifically itemized in the Commission Report. Of the 1200+ witnesses whose testimony was taken by the Commission, approximately 160 were conducted publicly. Rodriguez complains that his testimony never appeared in the Commission Report and that many of the survivors were not called to testify. However, the Commission acknowledges that its report is only a summary of the work that it did, and that it specifically cites only a fraction of the sources it consulted. It acknowledges that due to the scope of the events touching so many issues and organizations, it did not interview every knowledgeable person or find every relevant piece of paper, but that its report is a foundation for a better understanding of a landmark in the history of the United States.
