= Levenson Self-Report Psychopathy Scale =

Research measure of psychopathy

The Levenson Self-Report Psychopathy scale (LSRP) is a 26-item, 4-point Likert scale, self-report inventory to measure primary and secondary psychopathy in non-institutionalized populations. It was developed in 1995 by Michael R. Levenson, Kent A. Kiehl and Cory Fitzpatrick. The scale was created for the purpose of conducting a psychological study examining antisocial disposition among a sample of 487 undergraduate students attending psychology classes at the University of California, Davis.

== Primary and secondary psychopathy ==
=== Background ===
Benjamin Karpman first theorised that psychopathy should be divided into two clinical subtypes in 1941. He believed that psychopathy presented itself in either a symptomatic or idiopathic manner. Symptomatic psychopathy referred to an individual who would exhibit psychopathic traits usually as a result of an underlying psychoneurosis or character neurosis. Idiopathic psychopathy, on the other hand, presented itself without a cause and rarely reacted to treatment. Karpman's theory has helped researchers to identify two subgroups of those who display psychopathic traits. These were subsequently labelled as primary and secondary psychopaths.

=== Primary psychopathy ===
The subtype known as "primary" psychopathy refers to individuals who are completely rational, lack anxiety and have high levels of interpersonal charm. Whilst these behaviours appear incredibly adaptive, primary psychopaths are also prone to dysfunctional and pathological traits such as an inability to learn from past mistakes and a lack of responsibility. Primary psychopaths may present few symptoms of having a major psychological disorder. This may go hand in hand with the more manipulative personality traits characterising primary psychopathic behaviour. In addition, manipulation is also a key component featured in the Dark Triad personality test (Machiavellianism), which is positively correlated with primary psychopathy. It has also been further suggested that primary psychopathy and Machiavellianism reflect similar constructs, with Machiavellianism being positively associated with the main traits of primary psychopathy. Further research has shown that psychopathy and Machiavellianism are "barely distinguishable" and features of the two often "overlap". This is further supported by research showing that Machiavellianism and primary psychopathy are situated in much of the same areas of the Interpersonal Circumplex., i.e., "cold-hearted" and "high dominance" sections. Other traits include impaired interpersonal skills, not being able to function adequately in social situations due to the mere nature of the traits such as a lack of empathy.

=== Secondary psychopathy ===
"Secondary" psychopaths are individuals not dissimilar to primary psychopaths in the sense that they still share many of the same characteristics and traits. However, unlike the primary psychopath, the secondary psychopath is more likely to suffer from intense emotional arousal and psychological issues. As well as this, research conducted on adult psychopaths has suggested that secondary psychopaths are more prone to participate in drug abuse, suicide and interpersonal aggression. Research suggests that secondary psychopathic traits may include remorse and being more tense in contrast to individuals labelled as primary psychopaths. Karpman believed that behaviours carried out by secondary psychopaths aren’t grounded in lack of empathy which is seen in primary psychopaths. An integral finding amongst secondary psychopathic traits is the tendency to be less risk averse and more risk tolerant. For example, a study showed that individuals with secondary psychopathic traits were more likely to consistently choose cards with considerably higher net loses opposed to ones that posed less risk and gain. This is consistent with other research, which also suggests a consistent positive association between impulsivity and secondary psychopathy. Whilst controlling for impulsivity, risky decision making was still prevalent amongst secondary psychopathic behaviour. Overall, what differentiates secondary psychopaths from primary psychopaths is their destructive behaviour as well an increased reactivity and impulsivity and an inability to control their emotions effectively.

=== Evaluation ===
Studies have supported the existence of these two subgroups. For example, after a questionnaire assessing personality was distributed to 96 psychopathic male prisoners, the researchers conducting the study concluded the best-fitting model for the differences in personality was two separate groups. One group was labelled "emotionally stable psychopaths" and the other was labelled "aggressive psychopaths". The aggressive psychopaths were more emotionally reactive and lacked control whereas the emotionally stable psychopaths had high levels of achievement and social skills and low levels of stress reaction.

== Development and scoring ==
The purpose of the scale was to test for these two sub-groups of primary and secondary psychopathy as identified by Karpman as well as their attributions with "prosocial and antisocial behaviours". This was aimed at “non-institutionalised” populations in Levenson’s study.

The LSRP is partially based on Robert D. Hare's diagnostic Psychopathy Checklist-Revised (PCL-R) and consists of 26 statements which participants must decide their attitudes towards using a 4-point Likert scale ("disagree strongly", "disagree somewhat", "agree somewhat" and "agree strongly"). Seven of the items were reversed to reduce response bias.

The PCL-R is one of the key assessments used to signal psychopathy and traits associated with it in individuals, mainly used on institutionalised individuals in the population in contrast to the LSRP. The LSRP aimed to measure similarly what the PCL-R does by using similar “descriptors” for behavioural traits. These include tendency for regular deception, lack of empathy and remorse and Machiavellian behaviour.

Examples of items from the self-report scale include: "I tell other people what they want to hear so that they will do what I want them to do" and "I often admire a really clever scam". These statements aimed to focus on typical moral dilemmas one may face as opposed to accentuating criminal behaviour. This was to account for the LSRP’s use on university students, making the scale easier to conceptualise. The wording of these response options is made to lessen the stigma around personality traits by reducing any means of condemnation.

A factor analysis was initially conducted on the items in the LSRP and two factors (primary and secondary psychopathy) were derived from the scale. 16 of the statements from the scale determined primary psychopathy and the remaining 10 determined secondary psychopathy. The statements that were attributed to primary psychopathy were more to do with manipulation and a lack of empathy whereas the statements attributed to secondary psychopathy were focused on behavioural issues.

Based on the results of the initial study, the following thresholds for the results were established:

- ≤48: Non-psychopathic group
- 49-57: Mixed group
- ≥58: Psychopathic group

== Criticism ==
=== Validity ===
==== Construct validity ====
The LSRP intends to measure the same constructs as the PCL-R. Significant correlations suggest that the LSRP does correlate with the PCL-R for both factors of psychopathy. A study by Chad Brinkley in 2001 tested the concurrent and construct validity of the LSRP with the PCL-R with a sample of prison inmates. Small to moderate correlations were found between the LSRP and PCL-R, as well as associations between primary and secondary psychopathy ("factor 1" and "factor 2" in the PCL-R). Although the total correlations between the two measures were small, this was still nevertheless a significant finding from further statistical testing. This finding was also predominantly consistent across different demographics within the sample. However, these correlations being small to moderate suggest that the LSRP and PCL-R are measuring somewhat different constructs.

A study by Martin Sellbom in 2010 also studied male inmates and college students to assess construct validity in the LSRP. It was compared with various other measures such as the "Psychopathic Personality Inventory” (PPI), the “Machiavellianism Inventory-IV” (MACH-IV) and the “Emotional Empathy Scale”. Results signalled the LSRP had strong correlations with some aspects of these measures which tested for narcissistic, impulsive traits and prevalence of substance abuse. There were overall moderate correlations between the LSRP and the PPI but no significant correlations with the Emotional Empathy Scale. The LSRP therefore partially correlates with other predominant measures of psychopathy, but these correlations are not consistent across all self-report measures, with some differences seen between institutionalised and non-institutionalised populations.

Further research tested the LSPR against a range of other self-report measures which explored concepts associated with psychopathic behavioural traits. After analysing this, findings showed that there were correlations between the LSRP and other self-report measures assessing similar conducts such as "harm avoidance".

==== Internal validity ====
The LSRP suffers much of the same problems as other self-reported data. As the participant is completing the form themselves, they are more likely to be subject to biases that can change how they answer questions and thus jeopardise the internal validity of the data. An example of such is the recall bias in which participants must recall what they believe to be relevant information to complete the self-report. However, without the presence of an interviewer who is able to guide the participants thought process, the participant may be using incorrect information that they called upon to answer a question. The potential for this problem is much higher in self-reported data than interviews.

Self-report psychopathy measures are susceptible to social desirability bias, in which individuals may alter their given responses according to what they think is socially acceptable or “desired”, therefore possibly giving unrepresentative psychopathy characteristics for that individual. This could stem from certain stigmas surrounding mental health disorders. This threats the internal validity of the assessment as the nature of the questionnaire may produce inaccurate findings of the population’s behavioural dispositions and thus the scale is not measuring what it intends to measure. For example, in Levenson’s study, responses could lead to wrong grouping of individuals, such as being classed as non-psychopathic when actual responses may lead to being put into the psychopathic group due to “underreporting”. However, an analysis into the effects of this bias on the LSRP and other measures found a negative relationship between psychopathy measures and social desirability, indicating that there was limited social desirability bias in the results. Alternatively, it has been suggested that due to dishonesty being a key feature of psychopathy, using self-report methods to assess people will no doubt lead to mistrust in results.

The cognitive burden of self-reported data is also higher than interviews. The LSRP, being a visual questionnaire, requires literacy skills, a lack of visual impairment and ability to use your hands as well as the ability to follow instructions. Compared to interviews, this increased cognitive burden could result in a lower quality of data.

==== External validity ====
To create the LSRP, Levenson et al. only used undergraduate students studying psychology at a specific university. This is an example of selection bias and is likely to have negative implications for the external validity of the scale as the wider population does not consist of only undergraduate students. The development of the LSRP also used a WEIRD sample. This refers to a sample from a western, educated, industrialised, rich, democratic society. The problem with this is that due to the restricted sample, the LSRP may not be generalisable to the other 88% of the population who do not live in WEIRD societies, once again decreasing the external validity of the scale.

=== Reliability ===
==== Internal consistency reliability ====
Findings on the internal consistency reliability of the LSRP are mixed. A study in 2007 found Cronbach's alpha and mean interitem correlations were sufficient to determine good internal consistency reliability for the total LSRP score as well as the subgroup scores. However, a slightly later study found that the reliability of the items in the LSRP was low and attributed this to a few items in the scale. Once these items were removed, reliability improved.
