= RMH =

RMH can refer to:

- Response modulation hypothesis, suggesting that psychopathy is an attention disorder
- Royal Melbourne Hospital, Australia
- Riyadh Military Hospital, Saudi Arabia
- Ronald McDonald House, place to stay for families with hospitalized children
- Roh Moo-Hyun, the former president of South Korea (9/1/1946 - 5/23/2009)
