= Callous =

Callous is an adjective that may pertain to:

- Callus, a toughened area of skin
- Indifference to suffering – see cruelty
- Callous and unemotional traits

== See also ==
- Callous, a 2009 film by Joey Lanai
