= Influence of childhood trauma in psychopathy =

The influence of childhood trauma on the development of psychopathy in adulthood remains an active research question. Robert Hare's two factor model and Christopher Patrick's triarchic model have both been developed to better understand psychopathy.

Psychopathy is a personality construct consisting of affective, interpersonal, and behavioral dimensions that begins in childhood and manifests as aggressive actions in early or late adolescence. Childhood trauma affects vulnerability to different forms of psychopathology and traits associated with it. Parental behaviors such as rejection, abuse, neglect or overprotection show some relationship with the development of detrimental psychopathic traits. Disinhibition mediates the relationship between physical abuse and two components of psychopathy (social deviation and affective interpersonal). Sexual abuse is directly correlated with the social deviation factor, and physical abuse is directly correlated with the affective interpersonal factor. Gender differences have also been observed in psychopathy. For example, psychopathic antisocial personality traits are more noticeable in males while histrionic personality traits are more evident in females. In addition, women are more likely to experience internalizing psychopathology than men and males may exhibit a stronger association between boldness and the experience of neglect as a child, as well as between meanness and the experience of childhood maltreatment.

== Psychopathy ==
Psychopathy or psychopathic personality is a construct that was first researched extensively by the American psychiatrist, Hervey M. Cleckley, who wrote about the personality pathology in his book, The Mask of Sanity.

From Cleckley's work and conceptualization of psychopathy, Canadian psychologist Robert Hare developed the Psychopathy Check List (PCL-R), which was designed to detect and measure the presence of psychopathy. Hare formulated psychopathy into two factors: factor one (primary) which he defines as "selfish, callous and remorseless use of others," and factor two (secondary) which he defines as "chronically unstable, antisocial and socially deviant lifestyle."

Using a combination of Cleckley and Hare's work along with his own conceptualizations, psychologist Christopher Patrick formulated the triarchic model of psychopathy to better understand psychopathic assessment and to address unsolved issues within the field. Patrick's model formulates psychopathy as encompassing three distinct but interrelated phenotypic dispositions: boldness (social dominance and fearlessness), meanness (aggression towards others) and disinhibition (problems controlling impulses).

The question of what causes someone to develop psychopathy or psychopathic personality traits has been researched for years. A dominating question in the field is whether one's social environment or genetics are more influential in the development of the pathology. Some have argued that genetics is at the core of psychopathy with regards to the emotional dysfunction and reduced emotional responsiveness. However, others claim that environmental and social factors (such as childhood trauma) are at the forefront of the personality, but dependent on whether they fall into Hare's conceptualization of "primary" or "secondary" psychopathy.

Columbia University forensic psychiatrist Michael H. Stone considered that in some cases the "horrific backgrounds" of some serial killers who are psychopathic contribute to their crimes. In an August 2008 interview, Stone recalled the visit that he had made to serial killer Tommy Lynn Sells, who was on death row in Texas. Stone stated that Sells attributed much of his behavior to the traumas of his childhood, with Stone adding that Sells' mother had given the custody of Sells to an aunt who, in turn, exposed him to a pedophile who molested him. Stone related this vision in his 2009 book The Anatomy of Evil, along with others like brain injury and other issues in childhood or early adolescence that may contribute to some criminals' psychopathy.

== Influence of childhood trauma on psychopathy ==
Many question the influence that childhood traumatic experiences can have on a person's level of psychopathy. While many have found genetics to contribute to psychopathy, genetics alone cannot account for the etiology of psychopathy. The effects of childhood trauma can be seen in the relation it has with both psychopathic traits and inhibition of altruistic attitudes. In childhood, males who show higher levels of psychopathic traits are more likely to have experienced abuse and neglect, specifically emotional neglect, emotional abuse, physical abuse and sexual abuse. Because psychopathy has been heavily associated with interpersonal and social deficits, the effects of emotional neglect are of importance in assessment.

A caretaker's interaction with their children is imperative for the children's healthy development and survival. The behavior that a parent exhibits (e.g., rejection, overprotection, emotional warmth) towards their child shows implications towards the development of psychopathic traits. The model of psychopathy created by Christopher Patrick indicates associations between disinhibition, meanness and boldness in response to childhood maltreatment and parental behaviors. Specifically, disinhibition is linked to practically every facet of childhood maltreatment, with the exception of sexual abuse, overprotective parenting, and parental behavior (e.g., rejection and emotional warmth). Emotional neglect and mother overprotection have positive connections with meanness, while maternal and paternal emotional warmth have negative associations. Finally, both emotional maltreatment and physical neglect were linked to characteristics found in boldness.

== Gender differences ==
Christopher Patrick's triarchic model of psychopathy suggests that the dispositions of disinhibition and meanness are associated with self-reported childhood maltreatment. The association between boldness and childhood neglect is found to be stronger in males than females; the relationship between disinhibition and meanness and childhood maltreatment is also shown to be stronger in males than females. This shows that males with more marked boldness traits are less likely than females to report or suffer childhood trauma, likely because males with these traits have an advantage in mobilizing resilience and are less likely to perceive past painful events as maltreatment. It's possible that men with higher levels of disinhibition and meanness are more likely to report or experience these consequences.
