= Karpman =

Karpman is a surname. Notable people with the surname include:

- Benjamin Karpman (1886–1962), American psychiatrist
- Laura Karpman (born 1959), American composer
- Stephen B. Karpman, American psychiatrist, author of The Karpman drama triangle. Son of Benjamin Karpman.

== See also ==
- Karman
