= Psychopathic Personality Inventory =

Personality test for traits associated with psychopathy in adults

- Purpose: Identifies traits of psychopathy

The Psychopathic Personality Inventory (PPI) is a personality test for traits associated with psychopathy in adults. The PPI was developed by Scott Lilienfeld and Brian Andrews to assess these traits in non-criminal (e.g. university students) populations, though it is still used in clinical (e.g. incarcerated) populations as well. In contrast to other psychopathy measures, such as the Hare Psychopathy Checklist (PCL), the PPI is a self-report scale, rather than an interview-based assessment. It is intended to comprehensively index psychopathic personality traits without assuming particular links to anti-social or criminal behaviors. It also includes measures to detect impression management or careless responding.

== Factor structure ==
=== Development ===
==== Original subscales ====
The items used in the original version of the PPI were based on a number of conceptual constructs theorized (by previous researchers such as Hervey Cleckley and Robert D. Hare) to be related to psychopathy. It consists of a series of statements to which subjects respond on how accurately the statement describes them using a 4-point Likert scale ("false, "mostly false", "mostly true", "true").

Factor analysis of the initial 160 items revealed 8 factors:

- Machiavellian egocentricity (ME): A ruthless and self-centered willingness to exploit others
- Social potency (SOP): The ability to charm and influence others
- Coldheartedness (C): A distinct lack of emotion, guilt, or regard for others' feelings
- Carefree nonplanfulness (CN): Difficulty in planning ahead and considering the consequences of one's actions
- Fearlessness (F): An eagerness for risk-seeking behaviors, as well as a lack of the fear that normally goes with them
- Blame externalization (BE): Inability to take responsibility for one's actions, instead blaming others or rationalizing one's behavior
- Impulsive nonconformity (IN): A disregard for social norms and culturally acceptable behaviors
- Stress immunity (STI): A lack of typical marked reactions to traumatic or otherwise stress-inducing events

Additionally, the PPI also included two special validity scales designed to detect participants who were giving random, inconsistent, or insincere answers. This was to avoid attempts at malingering, and to eliminate subjects who seemed to have difficulty understanding multiple items.

==== Revised factors ====
In 2005, the PPI was revised. The new version, called the PPI-R, included a reorganization of the 8 subscales into two (sometimes three) new higher-order factors:

PPI-1: Fearless dominance (FD), consisting of the social potency, stress immunity, and fearlessness subscales. Associated with less anxiety, depression, and empathy as well as higher well-being, assertiveness, narcissism, and thrill-seeking.

PPI-2: Self-centered impulsivity (SCI), consisting of the carefree nonplanfulness, impulsive nonconformity, Machiavellian egocentricity, and blame externalization subscales. Associated with impulsivity, aggressiveness, substance use, antisocial behavior, negative affect, and suicidal ideation.

A person may score at different levels on the different factors, but the total score indicates the overall extent of psychopathic personality. Higher scores on factor I are associated with emotional stability and social efficacy, as well as reduced empathy. Higher scores on factor II are associated with maladaptive tendencies, including aggressiveness, substance use problems, negative feelings and suicidal ideation. Scores on the two major factors tend to be only moderately correlated.

==== Use of coldheartedness ====
Although independent analyses of the PPI's factor structure have shown support for the validity of the new 2-factor model, there is some data that suggests that a 3-factor model may be better. Many analyses of the PPI tend to exclude coldheartedness and focus only on FD and SCI, but some studies have shown the two factors to be less statistically reliable when coldheartedness is not also considered separately. Thus, some researchers are starting to use it as a distinct third factor in their analyses, as such meanness was a central part of Cleckley's conceptualization of a psychopath (see The Mask of Sanity). Coldheartedness has also been shown to be distinct from the other two factors when comparing across other personality models, such as the Five-factor model (FFM). In particular, coldheartedness has significantly negative correlations with the openness and agreeableness dimensions of the FFM.

In 2015, researchers from Baylor University proposed the connection between psychopaths' coldheartedness and their inability to “catch” the contagious yawning. Those who had more psychopathic qualities were less likely to yawn while watching the yawning clip.

==== Relationship to other psychopathy theories ====
The fearless dominance and self-centered impulsivity factors are similar to the concepts of primary and secondary psychopathy. Like primary psychopathy, FD traits are related to a lack of emotional responsivity but accurate perception of emotions in others. Conversely, secondary psychopathy and SCI traits are related to difficulties in both emotional perception and control of negative emotional responses, such as anxiety, irritation, and aggressiveness.

=== Validity ===
==== Construct validity ====
The PPI is based on a personality-centric theory of psychopathy. Thus, to demonstrate construct validity, the PPI should "be" as a measure of psychopathy is hypothesized to behave according to personality theory of psychopathy. According to this theory, psychopaths should possess a number of specific personality traits, including low conscientiousness, socialization, and empathy, as well as high impulsivity and sometimes aggression. Preliminary research suggests that the PPI behaves as the personality theory of psychopathy says it should. For example, one study of 100 male inmates found total PPI scores to be negatively correlated with empathy and positively correlated with aggressive behavior and borderline personality traits (such as impulsiveness, substance abuse, and unstable personal relationships). Additional studies have reexamined the same variables in light of the revision of the PPI into its two new higher order factors. Splitting the PPI into two separate factor scores (instead of using only the total score) allowed new relationships that were otherwise obscured to be revealed. These included PPI-1 having a strong correlation with measures of Dominance and extraversion, whereas the total score and PPI-2 had no such relationship, but PPI-2 did show a moderate association with substance abuse and anxiety. These relationships are consistent with the conceptualizations of the two factors. Thus, the PPI shows validity as a measure capable of assessing the personality theory of psychopathy.

==== Criterion validity ====
The PPI demonstrates strong levels of criterion validity. It shows modest correlations with the PCL, which is considered the "gold standard" of psychopathy assessments. Any discrepancies in scores have been theorized to stem from the fact that the PPI was designed for non-forensic populations and thus focuses more on personality than behavior, while the PCL (designed to assess the disorder in criminals) puts more emphasis on antisocial behaviors in its scoring system. Additionally, each measure uses a different form of data collection (interviews and a review of personal history vs. self-reports), which could also contribute to weaker correlations between the two scores, as discrepancies in the information obtained may result in very different conclusions.

==== Concurrent validity ====
The PPI exhibits moderate to strong correlations with other measures of psychopathy when used in cross-sectional designs. As stated earlier, the PCL and its derivatives are often used in criminal settings and consists of a semi-structured interview and review of the subject's criminal records. Despite being very different in format, some of the factors of the PPI correlate with the factors of the PCL. One series of studies found moderate correlations between PPI-SCI and PCL Factor 2, which like PPI-SCI examines impulsive and antisocial tendencies. The correlations between PPI-FD and PCL Factor 1 (which both examine interpersonal relations and emotional deficits) were not nearly as strong, but the researchers suggested that this was due to the method variance (self-report vs. interview/file review), and that the correlations were typical for measures of the same construct using different methods. Because of this, it has been suggested that the PPI and interview-based measures of psychopathy like the PCL examine unique aspects of psychopathy while still sharing some overlap.

==== Gender differences ====
Because of the disproportionately large number of male inmates compared to female, some studies have explored whether the validity of the PPI is affected by the gender of the population. One study used an incarcerated female sample to test this, and found that while the statistical reliability of the PPI factors was below the normal average for men, the measure proved to be satisfactory at assessing psychopathic traits in comparison to the PCL, the measure most commonly used to assess psychopathy in prison samples. In comparison to other self-report measures, another study compared a female undergraduate sample with an incarcerated female sample. Although the measure correlated well with other self-report measures of psychopathy in both samples, the mean total scores between the two samples was the same, despite prisons normally having a far higher concentration of psychopaths than the general population. This suggests that the PPI has greater difficulty in detecting psychopathic traits in female criminals, possibly due to the expression of psychopathy varying by sex.

=== Ranking public figures ===
In 2016 psychologist Dr. Kevin Dutton enlisted several historians to rank the psychopathic traits of various US historical and political figures using the 56-item short form of the PPI-R. According to that assessment, Adolf Hitler scored 169 points, Donald Trump received 171. Margaret Thatcher scored 136 points, and Elizabeth I scored 130. Jesus and Saint Paul both scored 157 points. According to Dutton, politicians and business leaders often demonstrate psychopathic qualities.

== Criticism ==
=== Fearless dominance ===
Some researchers have criticized the status of the fearless dominance (FD) factor of the PPI-R as an orthogonal factor of the psychopathy construct. A 2012 meta-analysis found that while the FD and SCI factors of the PPI-R did not overlap much, FD had very weak or non-statistically significant correlations with variables normally associated with psychopathy (such as anti-social behavior, violence, or substance abuse). When compared to other two-factor models of psychopathy (such as the two factors of the PCL-R), the SCI and PPI-R total score correlated well with their corresponding factors, but FD had weak correlations with its supposed PCL equivalent. On the contrary, PPI-FD's best relationships were with positive personality traits, such as extroversion. This observation caused the researchers to suggest that the FD factor, examined alone, is actually more indicative of the personality of a mentally healthy, well-adjusted individual. They thus concluded that FD was not a valid factor of psychopathy by itself, as it did not appear to fit into the pathological definitions of psychopathic personality conceptually or empirically.

In response, some of the creators and supporters of the PPI-R defended fearless dominance as a legitimate aspect of psychopathy, arguing that the authors of the meta-analysis were misinterpreting the role and importance of the factor. They contended that FD helps to distinguish psychopathy from other personality disorders, such as antisocial personality disorder, and that the traits that were similar to well-adjusted individuals are part of the "mask of sanity" associated with psychopathy. Without the presence of the FD factor (in their opinion), psychopathy would be a mere subset of anti-social behavior. They also criticized the choice of comparison variables the meta-analysis employed, noting that anti-social behavior and substance abuse are more commonly associated with the SCI factor rather than the FD factor (which would cover areas such as low empathy and immunity to stress), so their data would naturally result in weak FD correlations. Furthermore, the fact that the PCL and PPI-R are designed for different types of sample populations (criminal vs. community), and thus could have very different outcomes and relationships when comparing factors, was reason to doubt the conclusions of the meta-analysis.

The authors of the meta-analysis quickly attempted to address some of these criticisms. They contended that the PPI-R supporters were downplaying the role of anti-social behavior in assessing psychopathy, and that doing so could result in accidentally identifying otherwise normal extroverts as psychopathic. They also reemphasized the fact that the FD factor's best correlations were with positive personality traits such as extroversion, which to them suggests that the FD factor is a better indicator of psychological well-being rather than malfunction. Furthermore, they accused their critics of cherry picking their selections of data in order to support their own claims while criticizing the conclusions of the meta-analysis.

In the end, most researchers agree that fearless dominance, by itself, is not a sufficient indicator of psychopathy, and that anti-social behavior does need to be a prominent feature regardless of whether the psychopath is a criminal or an ordinary citizen. The authors of the meta-analysis did admit that some of the more pathological components of FD (such as unconcern for other or self-assurance) may have a place in the description of psychopathic traits, but that a high presence of these in an individual in the absence of other psychopathy factors is not truly psychopathic personality or behavior. The two parties thus ultimately continued to disagree on the place of FD in psychopathy, with PPI-R supporters maintaining that the factor is an important distinguishing feature of the disorder, and their critics claiming it is ultimately unnecessary and may be better suited in assessing social adjustment and sanity (rather than the "moral insanity" of psychopaths).

=== Self-report related issues ===
Because the PPI and PPI-R are self-report measures, there are several potential weaknesses in using it with certain populations or under certain circumstances.

==== Positive impression management ====
In criminal populations, psychopathy assessments are often used in threat assessment to determine if inmates are fit for early release or solitary confinement. Thus, it is often beneficial to inmates to appear less psychopathic (less callous or manipulative, more empathetic, etc.) in order to receive a more positive assessment or judgment. Although the PPI has a validity scale built into it, the measure was designed using populations in which no real "stakes" were involved, which may have resulted in the measure being prone to manipulation by the taker when there is a need to appear "less" psychopathic. One study that explored this used a social desirability scale as well as a few direct questions about participants' honesty and motivation, given after completing the PPI. The data showed that participants who were instructed to be "faking good" (intentionally trying to create a positive impression) had lower mean scores on the PPI and higher scores on the social desirability scale than those who were given no instructions or told to be honest in their answers. Despite the validity scales built into the PPI being able to indicate when such response distortion was occurring in many of the cases, a significant number of misclassifications were observed. Thus, the researchers concluded that the PPI was vulnerable to manipulation by respondents consciously attempting to present themselves in a positive light, which could limit its utility in criminal populations or any situations in which users have a significant motivation to appear well-adjusted. The study has not yet been replicated using the revised form of the scale, the PPI-R, however.

==== Malingering ====
Individuals may sometimes benefit from appearing to be mentally ill, such as when attempting an insanity defense. In relation to psychopathy, individuals possessing psychopathic traits are often more apt to engage in this sort of deception for practical or amusement purposes, and thus may possibly pose a greater risk for malingering than other populations. Thus, the PPI (being a self-report measure) may be similarly vulnerable to malingering. As in the case of positive impression management, the validity scales built into the PPI were designed to detect such manipulation. One study that examined whether these scales could reliably detect feigned psychosis found that these scales did indeed classify malingering effects correctly with over 95% accuracy, including individuals with high scores. This was in spite of the fact that participants were specifically told to fake some form of insanity (having even been given common symptoms of several mental illnesses to assist them), as well as being made aware that the instrument (the PPI) was designed to detect faking beforehand. Thus, the researchers concluded that higher PPI scores were not associated with greater success at malingering on the PPI (other psychopathy measures, such as the PCL and the Psychopathic Deviate scale of the Minnesota Multiphasic Personality Inventory, were used to further confirm the presence of psychopathic traits). However, because the sample did not include any participants meeting criteria for an official diagnosis of psychosis, it is unknown whether those with an actual mental illness would also be classified correctly on the validity scales. As with positive impression management, this study has yet to be replicated with the PPI-R.
