= Callous and unemotional traits =

Persistent pattern of behavior reflecting disregard and lack of empathy for others

Callous–unemotional traits (CU) are distinguished by a persistent pattern of behavior that reflects a disregard for others, and also a lack of empathy and generally deficient affect. The interplay between genetic and environmental risk factors may play a role in the expression of these traits as a conduct disorder (CD). While originally conceived as a means of measuring the affective features of psychopathy in children, measures of CU have been validated in university samples and adults.

A CU specifier has been included as a feature of conduct disorder in the fifth revision of the Diagnostic and Statistical Manual of Mental Disorders (DSM-5) and the eleventh edition of the International Classification of Diseases (ICD-11).

== Symptoms ==
=== Core features ===
CU traits, as measured by the Inventory of Callous-Unemotional Traits (ICU), are in three categories: callous (reflecting ruthlessness and cruel treatment or disregard for others), uncaring (passive disregard for others and lack of prosocial emotion), and unemotional (limited experience and expression of emotion). Unemotional traits are uniquely elevated in cases reflecting "primary psychopathy".

DSM-5's "limited prosocial emotions" specifier and attendant interview measure, the Clinical Assessment of Prosocial Emotions (CAPE), lists the following characteristics:

- Lack of remorse or guilt
- Shallow or deficient affect (unemotionality)
- Callous–lack of empathy
- Unconcerned with performance (at work or school)
- Lack of reaction to what would be a traumatic event

=== Associated features ===
Children with CU traits have distinct problems in emotional and behavioral regulation that distinguish them from other antisocial youth and show more similarity to characteristics found in adult psychopathy. Antisocial youth with CU traits tend to have a range of distinctive cognitive characteristics. They are often less sensitive to punishment cues, particularly when they are already keen for a reward. CU traits are positively related to good intellectual verbal skills.

== Classification ==
A CU specifier for conduct disorder was added to DSM-5. The addition "with limited prosocial emotions" to the conduct disorder diagnosis in DSM-5 is to classify a specific subgroup of antisocial youth with distinguishing antisocial behaviors and psychopathic traits. The provision of the CU specifier for CD youth is claimed to improve the diagnostic power, treatment options, and increase the understanding life-course outcomes. A 2008 review concluded that CU did not have the required evidence base to be included as a new diagnosis in DSM-5.

== Causes and pathophysiology ==
=== Neural mechanisms ===
The fearlessness theory of CU traits suggests that low amounts of cortisol lead to underarousal, causing impairments in fear processing, a trait seen in CU individuals. Hypoactivity in the hypothalamic-pituitary-adrenal axis in combination with CU traits seem to cause antisocial behavior even without external hardships.

=== Genetic ===
Twin studies have found CU traits to be highly heritable, and not significantly related to environmental factors such as socioeconomic status, school quality, or parent quality. Two twin studies suggested a significant genetic influence for CU, with an estimated average amount of variation (42.5%) in CU traits accounted for by genetic effects. A substantial proportion of this genetic variation occurred independent of other dimensions of psychopathy. Children with conduct problems who also exhibit high levels of CU traits reflect a particularly high heritability rate of 0.81, as reflected in longitudinal research.

A study on a large group of children found more than 60% heritability for callous-unemotional traits and that conduct problems among children with these traits had a higher heritability than among children without these traits. The study also found slight sex differences (boys 64%, girls 49%) in the affective-interpersonal factor. Similarly, the impulsive–antisocial factor was primarily influenced by genetic factors (boys 46%; girls 58%)

Maltreatment and parenting play a role in the development of antisocial behavior, and studies have been shown to prove this. While callous unemotional traits are rooted in genetics, environmental triggers are an important contributing factor for the development of antisocial behaviour in children with the genetic propensity.

== Criticism ==
Primatologist Frans de Waal argues that evolutionary theory postulates that biological altruism in primates evolved for the return-benefits it bears the performer. Some evolutionary biologists, therefore, criticize the psychiatric model of callous-unemotional traits (CU) on the grounds that CU is inconsistent with evolutionary continuity. Rather, these biologists argue that if empathy had evolved through mammalian evolution, beginning with empathy restricted to close relatives and extending over the course of evolution to include more distant relatives, then empathy with other humans could be expected to be necessary but not sufficient for human empathy with nonhuman animals. This evolutionary biology model of altruism and empathy thus contrasts with the psychiatric model of CU because the latter implies that cruelty to animals is a predictor of violence to other humans— but not the other way around.

== Diagnosis ==
Research has attempted to subtype youth with callous-unemotional traits by distinguishing between those with childhood-onset versus adolescent-onset conduct disorder, conduct disorder co-morbid with attention deficit hyperactivity disorder (ADHD), or by the severity and type of aggression displayed. Children with CU traits have more severe conduct disorder, and respond to different management. The Inventory of Callous-Unemotional Traits (ICU) assesses three independent factors in CU traits: uncaring, callous, and unemotional. The severity of CD has been studied in children rated high on CU traits.

== Management ==
CU traits are relatively stable, though some studies suggest that they may decrease over time through effective treatment. Early intervention is thought to be more effective because CU traits are thought to be more malleable early in life.

=== Parenting techniques ===
Parenting interventions are the most commonly used treatment for treating early onset antisocial behaviors and conduct disorder in children, and quality parenting may be able to decrease the manifestation of CU traits. Children with high CU traits are less responsive to time-out and other punishment techniques than typical children as they are unperturbed by the threat of punishment and time-out does not seem to bother them, so their behavior does not improve. Reward-based disciplining techniques, such as praise and reinforcement, tend to have a greater effect than punishing techniques on children with high CU traits in reducing antisocial behavior.

== Prognosis ==
Childhood-onset CU shows a more aggressive and stable pattern of antisocial behavior with higher rates of CU traits, as well as more severe temperamental and neuropsychological risk factors relative to their adolescent-onset counterparts. Children with combined CD and ADHD are more likely to show features associated with psychopathy, but only in those who have high rates of CU traits. In support of the idea of lifetime persistence of CU traits, childhood-onset delinquency has been more strongly associated with psychopathic traits than adolescent-onset delinquency. A longitudinal twin study of children with CD showed that high or increasing levels of CU traits comorbid with CD presented with the most negative outcomes after twelve years in relationships with peers and family, as well as emotional and behavioral problems, as compared to those with low CU traits or CD alone. In addition, adolescents with CU traits have shown higher likelihood to commit a violent crime within a two-year period of their release from a correctional facility than those without CU traits. Antisocial youth with CU traits tend to show less response to treatment.

A systematic review found that CU traits were associated with poorer outcomes in family-based interventions for conduct problems. This suggests pre-treatment data on CU traits is clinically informative in terms of the prognostic status of children and young people with CU traits.

== History ==
Due to the potential severity of antisocial and violent traits seen in adult psychopathy, research has focused on identifying the associated traits in childhood. In adult psychopathy, individuals with primarily affective and interpersonal deficits show a distinct etiology. Similarly, different subtypes of aggressive and antisocial behaviors in youth may predict distinct problem-behaviors and risk factors. There have been a number of attempts to officially designate psychopathic-like traits in antisocial youths based on the affective and interpersonal traits of psychopathy. The third edition of the Diagnostic and Statistical Manual of Mental Disorders (DSM III) divided conduct disorder into four subtypes: undersocialized-aggressive, undersocialized-nonaggressive, socialized-aggressive, and socialized-nonaggressive in an attempt to recognize the existence of psychopathic traits in children. The distinction between "socialized" and "undersocialized" children was the most pertinent in distinguishing between psychopathic-like youths. According to these definitions, "undersocialized" children exhibited characteristic behaviors of psychopathy, including: lack of empathy, lack of affection, and inappropriate social relationships (DSM III). This differed from "socialized" individuals, who were able to form healthy social attachments to others, and whose aggressive and antisocial acts typically derived from engagement in a deviant social group (e.g. youth gangs).

Following the publication of DSM-III, these distinctions prompted research, but there were still issues with the terminology in diagnosing the core features of the undersocialized versus socialized subtype. The word undersocialized was used in order to avoid the negative connotations of psychopathy, but was commonly misinterpreted to mean that the child was not well socialized by parents or lacked a peer group. Also, the operational definition failed to include dimensions that could reliably predict the affective and interpersonal deficits in psychopathic-like youths. Due to these issues, the American Psychiatric Association removed the undersocialized and socialized distinctions from the conduct disorder description in the DSM after the third edition. The only subtypes that have been included in the manual since then relate to the time of onset: childhood-onset (before age 10), adolescent-onset (absence of antisocial traits before age 10), and unspecified-onset.

== See also ==
- Alexithymia
- Antisocial personality disorder
- Apathy
- Conduct disorder
- Psychopathy
