= Kent Kiehl =

American neuroscientist

Kent A. Kiehl is an American neuroscientist with research interests in cognitive neuroscience, psychopathy, interaction of neuroscience and law, and behavioral prediction. He is professor at the department of psychology, University of New Mexico. Dr. Kiehl completed his undergraduate degree at the University of California-Davis and received his doctorate in 2000 from the University of British Columbia under the tutelage of Drs. Robert Hare and Peter Liddle. Dr. Kiehl has published over 200 peer-review papers, listed on his Curriculum Vitae.

Dr. Kiehl uses brain imaging techniques to investigate mental illnesses, in particular, criminal psychopathy, psychotic disorders (e.g., schizophrenia), affective disorders, traumatic brain injury, substance abuse and paraphilias.

The laboratory Mind Research Network headed by Kiehl collected the world largest sample of brain scans of incarcerated people using a mobile MRI scanner. They also started collecting brain scan of people in contact sports to study effect of contact sports on brain ("Brain Safe Project").

== Books ==
- 2014: The Psychopath Whisperer: The science of those without conscience
- 2013: Handbook on Psychopathy and Law (co-edited with Walter P. Sinnott-Armstrong)
