= Response modulation hypothesis =

Theory about the cause of psychopathic behaviour

The response modulation hypothesis is an etiological theory which argues that psychopathy is an attention disorder, and is not caused by an inherent lack of empathy or fear. It posits that when psychopaths focus on a particular goal, they are unable to shift their attention to peripheral signals or cues if they are unrelated to the main goal. Usually outside signals prevent people from antisocial behaviors (such as anxiety deterring someone from environmental dangers or empathy deterring someone from harming others) but psychopaths do not focus on these signals if they do not relate to their main goal.

Response modulation argues that the attention to goals is what modulates whether psychopaths have normal or abnormal levels of fear and empathy. In studies when psychopaths were asked to focus on these cues, they had normal levels of fear and empathy.

== History and evolution ==
The theory was first proposed by Gorenstein and Newman (1980) and has since gone through changes. Initially it was proposed as theory of reward hypersensitivity in response to the Low Fear theory proposed by David T. Lykken. Gorenstein and Newman found that animals with septal and hippocampal lesions could behave in ways analogous to human psychopaths: animals with lesions did not respond to punishment conditioning when an award was offered but obeyed punishments when there was no award. Similarly, psychopaths have problems with deterrence in the presence of reward.

The theory has since changed to be more generalizable for personal behavior, shifting away from sensitivity to rewards to an attention bottleneck disorder of overly focusing on early information.

== Empirical evidence ==
Meta-analysis authors (Note: This is based on meta-analyses that tested for response modulation and alternative theories.)	Response modulation hypothesis		Other theories	
	Effect size	Statistically significant?	Effect size	Statistically significant?
Smith and Lilienfeld (2015)	r = .20	Yes (p < .001)	No other theories tested.	No other theories tested.
Hoppenbrouwers, et al. (2016)	r = .21	Yes (p < .05)	Low fear hypothesis: r = .097	Low fear hypothesis: No (significance not reported)

Meta-analyses have investigated response modulation studies for empirical validity. One such analysis by Smith and Lilienfeld (2015) evaluated 94 experimental samples with a total of 7,340 participants found that the relationship between attention impairment and psychopathy had a statistically significant effect size of 0.20. The authors considered this to be a "small to medium effect." The effect remained largely unchanged when adjusting for factors such as rater bias (raters evaluated how psychopathic an individual was), sample size or authors' theoretical bias. They did find however that there could be a publication bias in favor of the theory.

Another meta-analysis by Hoppenbrouwers, Bulten and Brazil (2016) parceled the construct of fear into a component consisting of automatic threat processing (which they considered compatible with response modulation) and a second component capturing the conscious experience of fear (based on self-evaluations and fear recognition). They used this new framework to empirically test whether psychopathy was related to reduced experience of fear ('fearlessness'), as has been assumed for the past decades. They found that threat processing had a significant effect size of 0.21, while the effect size for fearlessness was only 0.097 and insignificant. The effect size for impaired threat processing in psychopathy was similar to that for attention impairments, and Hoppenbrouwers and colleagues suggested that "disturbed modulation of attention or threat processing impairments in psychopathy seem to outperform other frameworks postulating that a lack of fear experience is central to psychopathy."

== See also ==
- Attenuation theory
- Attention deficit hyperactivity disorder

== Media ==
- Office Hours: Psychopathy, University of Wisconsin–Madison
