= Superficial charm =

Flattery, telling people what they want to hear

Superficial charm (or insincere charm) is a social act used to mask underlying insincerity or malicious intent. Ordinarily, charm is a byproduct of genuine interest in others and involves displaying one's best personality traits. Charm becomes superficial when it is motivated by a desire to ingratiate or persuade whilst hiding large aspects of one's personality, subverting the genuine warmth of ordinary charm. It is associated with antisocial personality disorder (ASPD) and is listed on the Psychopathy Checklist-Revised (PCL-R).

== Background ==
Clinical interest in superficial charm emerged in The Mask of Sanity by Hervey Cleckley, who observed that psychopathic individuals could navigate social situations with apparent ease, whilst experiencing none of the emotional engagement that ordinarily underlies human connection. Cleckley listed superficial charm as the first of his sixteen diagnostic criteria for psychopathy, describing it as a captivating yet ultimately shallow persona adopted to conceal destructive, antisocial behaviour. This work later informed the Psychopathy Checklist-Revised (PCL-R), developed by Robert Hare. In the PCL-R, superficial charm is grouped under Factor 1, a cluster of traits associated with low anxiety and limited empathy, but high scores on measures of social dominance and goal-directed behaviour. Superficial charm can also be measured using self-report tools such as the Psychopathic Personality Inventory-Revised (PPI-R) which, unlike the PCL-R, has a non-criminal focus.

== Psychology and neurobiology ==
Superficial charm is positively correlated with verbal fluency, verbal abstraction, and verbal inhibition. These heightened verbal abilities reduce the cognitive load required to simultaneously track others' reactions, suppress authentic responses, and construct a tailored persona, making the performance of charm less effortful and therefore harder to detect. Whilst not every individual with psychopathic traits uses superficial charm, some instead displaying overtly aggressive methods of coercion, it remains an effective tool for ingratiation and persuasion.

Susceptibility to superficial charm can be partly explained by the self-enhancement motive, the natural motivation to feel good about oneself. Research shows that people who are flattered are more likely to like and assign credibility to the flatterer than observers, driven by a motivation to view themselves positively. This effect does not vary by self-esteem, meaning susceptibility to charm is broadly universal. Furthermore, researchers have demonstrated that even obviously manipulative charm can be effective: insincere flattery increases positive evaluations even when recipients are aware of the ulterior motive, as positive implicit attitudes persist despite conscious scepticism.

Superficial charm reflects an absence of the emotional states, such as empathy and guilt, that ordinarily underpin genuine connection, and as such indicates a disruption between emotion and behaviour. Research on incarcerated offenders found that superficial charm is correlated with reduced structural integrity of the right uncinate fasciculus (UF), a major white matter tract connecting the frontal and temporal lobes, which plays a critical role in social and emotional functioning. These deficits are further associated with abnormal structure and function in the amygdala and orbitofrontal cortex, regions responsible for emotional processing and decision-making. Because these structures underlie empathy and fear conditioning, reduced functioning means these individuals do not experience the emotional responses that would otherwise inhibit insincere or manipulative behaviour.

== Evolutionary perspective ==
From an evolutionary standpoint, superficial charm may have been psychologically adaptive. It is best understood as part of the dark triad, a cluster of personality traits (including sub-clinical psychopathy) that researchers have proposed may represent evolved strategies for social and reproductive gain. Superficial charm may function as a strategic interpersonal tool. By simulating genuine warmth without the emotional investment it ordinarily requires, individuals can rapidly generate trust at low psychological cost to themselves.

There is empirical support for the reproductive advantages superficial charm may offer. Research suggests that women rate male personalities high in Dark Triad traits as more attractive than controls, particularly in short-term mating contexts, suggesting that charm associated with these traits has genuine appeal in mate selection. Jonason et al. (2009) further found that dark triad traits, including superficial charm, were correlated with short-term mating success but not long-term relationship quality, suggesting that charm helps psychopathic individuals gain social access quickly before others recognise their true intentions.

== Criticism ==
The construct validity of superficial charm has been questioned on several grounds. In his original clinical observations, Cleckley emphasised social ease and good intelligence as the defining features of superficial charm. However, Hare’s description of the same concept reflects a more deviant characterisation. As these represent subtly different psychological constructs, questions arise about whether the two measures are capturing the same phenomenon, undermining the construct validity of superficial charm as a diagnostic category.

A further challenge concerns the distinction between superficial and genuine charm in practice. Most people believe themselves capable of detecting insincerity, yet research consistently demonstrates that this confidence is largely unwarranted. Positive implicit attitudes toward a charmer persist even after they are consciously aware of its insincerity. This suggests that superficial charm may be more accurately described as a retrospective label because charm is often only identified as superficial after a betrayal of trust, rather than in the moment. This raises the question of whether superficiality is a property of the charmer's psychology, or a judgement made by the observer after the fact.

Finally, cross-cultural research has questioned the universality of superficial charm. Shariat et al. (2010) found that the interpersonal features of psychopathy, including superficial charm, showed lower discriminatory power in a non-Western prison sample compared to a Western sample, suggesting that the expression of charm is shaped by cultural norms around social behaviour. Other emotional experiences, such as lack of remorse, were found to be more diagnostically reliable across cultures, suggesting that the emotional core of psychopathy may be universal whilst its interpersonal expression, including superficial charm, is more dependent on cultural context.

== See also ==
- Virtue signalling
- Reduced affect display
