= Psychopathy Checklist =

Psychopathy scale

Cover of Hare's Psychopathy Checklist-Revised (2nd ed., 2003)

The Psychopathy Checklist or Hare Psychopathy Checklist-Revised, now the Psychopathy Checklist—revised (PCL-R), is a psychological assessment tool that is commonly used to assess the presence and extent of psychopathy in individuals—most often those institutionalized in the criminal justice system—and to differentiate those high in this trait from those with antisocial personality disorder, a related diagnosable disorder. It is a 20-item inventory of perceived personality traits and recorded behaviors, intended to be completed on the basis of a semi-structured interview along with a review of "collateral information" such as official records. The psychopath tends to display a constellation or combination of high narcissistic, borderline, and antisocial personality disorder traits, which includes superficial charm, charisma/attractiveness, sexual seductiveness and promiscuity, affective instability, suicidality, lack of empathy, feelings of emptiness, self-harm, and splitting (black and white thinking). In addition, sadistic and paranoid traits are usually also present.

The PCL was originally developed in the 1970s by Canadian psychologist Robert D. Hare for use in psychology experiments, based partly on Hare's work with male offenders and forensic inmates in Vancouver, and partly on an influential clinical profile by American psychiatrist Hervey M. Cleckley first published in 1941.

An individual's score may have important consequences for their future, and because the potential for harm if the test is used or administered incorrectly is considerable, Hare argues that the test should be considered valid only if administered by a suitably qualified and experienced clinician under scientifically controlled and licensed, standardized conditions. Hare receives royalties on licensed use of the test.

In psychometric terms, the current version of the checklist has two factors (sets of related scores) that correlate about 0.5 with each other, with Factor One being closer to Cleckley's original personality concept than Factor Two. Hare's checklist does not incorporate the "positive adjustment features" that Cleckley did.

== PCL-R model of psychopathy ==
The PCL-R is used for indicating a dimensional score, or a categorical diagnosis, of psychopathy for clinical, legal, or research purposes. It is rated by a mental health professional (such as a psychologist or other professional trained in the field of mental health, psychology, or psychiatry), using 20 items. Each of the items in the PCL-R is scored on a three-point scale according to specific criteria through file information and a semi-structured interview.

The scores are used to predict risk for criminal re-offense and probability of rehabilitation.

The current edition of the PCL-R officially lists three factors (1.a, 1.b, and 2.a), which summarize the 20 assessed areas via factor analysis. The previous edition of the PCL-R listed two factors. Factor 1 is labelled "selfish, callous and remorseless use of others". Factor 2 is labelled as "chronically unstable, antisocial and socially deviant lifestyle". There is a high risk of recidivism and mostly small likelihood of rehabilitation for those who are labelled as having "psychopathy" on the basis of the PCL-R ratings in the manual for the test, although treatment research is ongoing.

PCL-R Factors 1a and 1b are correlated with narcissistic personality disorder. They are associated with extraversion and positive affect. Factor 1, the so-called core personality traits of psychopathy, may even be beneficial for the psychopath (in terms of nondeviant social functioning).

PCL-R Factors 2a and 2b are particularly strongly correlated to antisocial personality disorder and borderline personality disorder and are associated with reactive anger, criminality, and impulsive violence. The target group for the PCL-R in prisons in some countries is criminals convicted of delict and/or felony. The quality of ratings may depend on how much background information is available and whether the person rated is honest and forthright.

== Items ==
- Item 1: Glibness/superficial charm
- Item 2: Grandiose sense of self-worth
- Item 3: Need for stimulation/proneness to boredom
- Item 4: Pathological lying
- Item 5: Conning/manipulative
- Item 6: Lack of remorse or guilt
- Item 7: Shallow affect
- Item 8: Callous/lack of empathy
- Item 9: Parasitic lifestyle
- Item 10: Poor behavioral controls
- Item 11: Promiscuous sexual behavior
- Item 12: Early behavior problems
- Item 13: Lack of realistic, long-term goals
- Item 14: Impulsivity
- Item 15: Irresponsibility
- Item 16: Failure to accept responsibility for own actions
- Item 17: Many short-term marital relationships
- Item 18: Juvenile delinquency
- Item 19: Revocation of conditional release
- Item 20: Criminal versatility

Each of the 20 items in the PCL-R is scored on a three-point scale, with a rating of 0 if it does not apply at all, 1 if there is a partial match or mixed information, and 2 if there is a reasonably good match to the offender. This is to be done through a face-to-face interview together with supporting information on lifetime behavior (e.g., from case files). It can take up to three hours to collect and review the information.

Out of a maximum score of 40, the cut-off for the label of psychopathy is 30 in the United States and 25 in the United Kingdom. A cut-off score of 25 is also sometimes used for research purposes.

High PCL-R scores are positively associated with measures of impulsivity and aggression, Machiavellianism, persistent criminal behavior, and negatively associated with measures of empathy and affiliation.

Early factor analysis of the PCL-R indicated it consisted of two factors. Factor 1 captures traits dealing with the interpersonal and affective deficits of psychopathy (e.g., shallow affect, superficial charm, manipulativeness, lack of empathy) whereas factor 2 deals with symptoms relating to antisocial behavior (e.g., criminal versatility, impulsiveness, irresponsibility, poor behavior controls, juvenile delinquency).

The two factors have been found by those following this theory to display different correlates. Factor 1 has been correlated with narcissistic personality disorder, low anxiety, low empathy, low stress reaction and low suicide risk but high scores on scales of achievement and social potency. In addition, the use of item response theory analysis of female offender PCL-R scores indicates factor 1 items are more important in measuring and generalizing the construct of psychopathy in women than factor 2 items.

In contrast, Factor 2 was found to be related to antisocial personality disorder, social deviance, sensation seeking, low socioeconomic status and high risk of suicide. The two factors are nonetheless highly correlated and there are strong indications they do result from a single underlying disorder. Research, however, has failed to replicate the two-factor model in female samples.

In 2001 researchers Cooke and Michie at Glasgow Caledonian University suggested, using statistical analysis involving confirmatory factor analysis, that a three-factor structure may provide a better model, with those items from factor 2 strictly relating to antisocial behavior (criminal versatility, juvenile delinquency, revocation of conditional release, early behavioral problems and poor behavioral controls) removed. The remaining items would be divided into three factors: arrogant and deceitful interpersonal style, deficient affective experience, and impulsive and irresponsible behavioral style. Hare and colleagues have criticized the Cooke and Michie three-factor model for statistical and conceptual problems, for example, for resulting in impossible parameter combinations (negative variances).

In the 2003 edition of the PCL-R, Hare added a fourth antisocial behavior factor, consisting of those factor 2 items excluded in the previous model. Again, these models are presumed to be hierarchical with a single, unified psychopathy disorder underlying the distinct but correlated factors. In the four-factor model of psychopathy, supported by a range of samples, the factors represent the interpersonal, affective, lifestyle, and overt antisocial features of the personality disorder.

== Use ==
The PCL-R is widely used to assess individuals in high-security psychiatric units, prisons and other settings. This may be of help in deciding who should be detained or released, or who should undergo what kind of treatment. It is also used in academic psychology for its original purpose as an assistive tool in studies on the pathology of psychopathy.

The PCL-R is also used as a risk assessment tool that attempts to predict who will offend or reoffend (recidivism). It is effective in assessing risk of sexual re-offending, which is especially helpful, as clinical judgement of recidivism is a poor predictor. The PCL-R seems to be more useful for violent sexual offenders who are not pedophiles.

In controlled research environments the inter-rater reliability of the PCL-R may be satisfactory, but in real-world settings it has been found to have rather poor agreement between different raters, especially on the personality trait scores.

=== Screening and Youth Versions ===
There are additional inventories directly from the PCL-R, including the Psychopathy Checklist: Screening Version (PCL:SV) and Psychopathy Checklist: Youth Version (PCL:YV). The PCL:SV was developed as a labor-saving assessment for the same forensic settings as the PCL-R and to meet the needs of settings where clients do not necessarily have criminal records (e.g. civil psychiatric patients). It includes 12 items and takes 90 minutes. According to the MacArthur violence risk assessment study in 2014, there is a stronger correlation between the PCL:SV results and later violence than any other of the 134 variables evaluated in that study. The PCL:YV assesses early signs of juvenile psychopathy in children and adolescents.

== Comparison with psychiatric diagnoses ==
Among laypersons and professionals, there is confusion about the meanings and differences between psychopathy, sociopathy, antisocial personality disorder (ASPD), and the ICD-10 diagnosis, dissocial personality disorder.

Hare takes the stance that psychopathy as a syndrome should be considered distinct from the Diagnostic and Statistical Manual of Mental Disorders-IV's antisocial personality disorder construct, although the DSM states ASPD has been referred to as or includes the disorder of psychopathy. Although the diagnosis of ASPD covers two to three times as many prisoners than the diagnosis of psychopathy, Hare believes the PCL-R is better able to predict future criminality, violence, and recidivism than a diagnosis of ASPD. He suggests there are differences between PCL-R-diagnosed psychopaths and non-psychopaths on "processing and use of linguistic and emotional information", while such differences are potentially smaller between those diagnosed with ASPD and without.

Although Hare wanted the DSM-IV-TR to list psychopathy as a unique disorder, the DSM editors were unconvinced and felt that there was too much room for subjectivity on the part of clinicians when identifying things like remorse and guilt; therefore, the DSM-IV panel decided to stick to observable behavior, namely socially deviant behaviors.

== Other PCL-R findings and controversy ==
=== Findings ===
According to Hare, one FBI study produced in 1992 found that 44 percent of offenders who killed a police officer were psychopaths. The study was 'Killed in the Line of Duty: A Study of Selected Felonious Killings of Law Enforcement Officers.'

Hare has described psychopaths as 'social predators', 'remorseless predators', or in some cases 'lethal predators', and has stated that 'Psychopathic depredations affect people in all races, cultures, and ethnic groups, and at all levels of income and social status'.

A study using the PCL-R to examine the relationship between antisocial behavior and suicide found that suicide history was strongly correlated to PCL-R factor 2 (reflecting antisocial deviance) and was not correlated to PCL-R factor 1 (reflecting affective functioning). Given that ASPD (antisocial personality disorder) and BPD (borderline personality disorder) relate to factor 2, whereas psychopathy relates to both factors, this would confirm Hervey M. Cleckley's assertion that psychopaths are relatively immune to suicide. People with ASPD, on the other hand, have a relatively high suicide rate. People with BPD have an even higher suicide rate, which is near 10%. PCL-R factor 1 is correlated to NPD (narcissistic personality disorder) and rarely ever commit suicide, although they may threaten to do so.

=== Controversy ===
Because an individual's scores may have important consequences for his or her future, the potential for harm if the test is used or administered incorrectly is considerable. The test can only be considered valid if administered by a suitably qualified and experienced clinician under controlled conditions.

There has been controversy over the use of the PCL-R by UK prison and secure psychiatric services, including its role in the government's administrative category of 'Dangerous and Severe Personality Disorder' (a separate older administrative category of 'psychopathic disorder' in the Mental Health Act was abolished in 2007). One leading forensic psychologist, while Deputy Chief at the Ministry of Justice, has argued that it has not lived up to claims that it could identify those who would not benefit from current treatments or those most likely to violently reoffend.

Several recent studies and very large-scale meta-analysis have cast serious doubt on whether the PCL-R performs as well as other instruments, or better than chance. To the extent that it does perform better, it is unclear whether it is due to the PCL-R's inclusion of past offending history, rather than the personality trait scores that make it unique.

== Criticism ==
In addition to the aforementioned report by Cooke and Michie that a three-factor structure may provide a better model than the two-factor structure, Hare's concept and checklist have faced other criticisms.

In 2010, there was controversy after it emerged that Hare had threatened legal action that stopped publication of a peer-reviewed article on the PCL-R. Hare alleged the article quoted or paraphrased him incorrectly. The article eventually appeared, three years later. It alleged that the checklist is wrongly viewed by many as the basic definition of psychopathy, yet it leaves out key factors, while also making criminality too central to the concept. The authors claimed this leads to problems in over-diagnosis and in the use of the checklist to secure convictions. Hare has since stated that he receives less than $35,000 a year from royalties associated with the checklist and its derivatives.

Hare's concept has also been criticised as being only weakly applicable to real-world settings and tending towards tautology. It is also said to be vulnerable to "labeling effects", to be simplistic, reductionist, to embody fundamental attribution error, and not pay enough attention to context and the dynamic nature of human behavior. It has been pointed out that half the criteria can also be signs of mania, hypomania, or frontal lobe dysfunction (e.g., glibness/superficial charm, grandiosity, poor behavioral controls, promiscuous sexual behavior, and irresponsibility).

Some research suggests that ratings made using the PCL system depend on the personality of the person doing the rating, including how empathic they themselves are. One forensic researcher has suggested that future studies need to examine the class background, race, and philosophical beliefs of raters because they may not be aware of enacting biased judgments on people whom they do not readily empathize with. Further, a review which pooled various risk assessment instruments including the PCL, found that peer-reviewed studies for which the developer or translator of the instrument was an author (which in no case was disclosed in the journal article) were twice as likely to report positive predictive findings.

== Notable evaluations ==
All scores are out of a maximum of 40.

- Paul Bernardo was evaluated as 35, while Karla Homolka was evaluated at 5 (a malignant narcissist).
- Dennis Rader was evaluated as 32.
- Ted Bundy was evaluated as 39.
- Jeffrey Dahmer was evaluated as 23.
- Brian Dugan was evaluated as 38.
- John Wayne Gacy was evaluated as 27.
- Charles Guiteau was evaluated as 37.5.
- Peter Lundin was evaluated as 39.
- Brian David Mitchell was evaluated as 34.
- Clifford Olson was evaluated as 38.
- Stephen Farrow was evaluated as 31.
- Gary Ridgway, was evaluated at 19.
- Aileen Wuornos was evaluated as 32.
- Dwight York was evaluated as 39.
- Daniel William Marsh was evaluated as 36.

== See also ==
- Actuarial tools in criminology
- Levenson Self-Report Psychopathy Scale
- List of diagnostic classification and rating scales used in psychiatry
- Narcissism
- Psychopathic Personality Inventory
