= Benjamin Karpman =

American psychiatrist

- Born: August 8, 1886; Slutzk, Belarus
- Died: May 24, 1962 (aged 75)

Academic background
- Education: University of Minnesota

Academic work
- Discipline: psychiatry
- Institutions: Howard University College of Medicine
- Main interests: human sexuality

Benjamin Karpman (August 8, 1886 – May 24, 1962) was an American psychiatrist known for his work on human sexuality. He served as Professor and Head of Psychiatry at Howard University College of Medicine from 1921 to 1941.

== Life and career ==
Karpman was born in Slutzk, Belarus. He graduated from the University of Minnesota, earning a bachelor's degree in 1915, a master's degree in 1918, and a Doctor of Medicine degree in 1920. While at University of Minnesota Medical School, he worked with Jesse Francis McClendon on pioneering in situ pH measurements in the human digestive tract. After completing his internship at St. Elizabeths Hospital, he rose to the position of Senior Medical Officer and Psychotherapist. Karpman was a proponent of psychoanalysis and published many case reports based on his clinical experience. At Howard, he introduced dynamic psychiatry into the medical curriculum.

Karpman was a contributor to The American Mercury, where he was critical of the Harrison Narcotics Tax Act. He was elected to the New York Academy of Sciences in 1953. Karpman was critical of both law and medicine in their treatment of social problems. He predicted that by 2010 the U.S. would have no prisons, just psychiatric treatment centers for lawbreakers. "I am at odds with the legal profession and most of psychiatry," he conceded, "but they're all wrong. The question is simply, 'Is the accused sick or not?' You can't have mental illness and criminal responsibility in the same person at the same time."

Karpman had a heart attack on May 23, 1962, and died the next day at the age of 75.

== Selected publications ==
- Woodrow, H; Karpman, B (1917). "A new olfactoric technique and some results". Journal of Experimental Psychology. 2 (6): 431–447. doi:10.1037/h0070193.
- McClendon, JF; Sheldon, A; Karpman, B (1918). "The hydrogen ion concentrations of the contents of the small intestine" (PDF). Journal of Biological Chemistry. 34: 1.
- Karpman B (1933). Case studies in the psychopathology of crime, Volume 1. Mimeoform Press
- Karpman B (1935). The individual criminal: studies in the psychogenetics of crime, Volume 1. Nervous and Mental Disease Pub. Co.
- Karpman, B; Washington, MD (1936). "The individual criminal". The British Medical Journal. 2 (3952): 676.
- Karpman, B (1941). "On the need of separating psychopathy into two distinct clinical types: the symptomatic and the idiopathic". Journal of Criminal Psychopathology. 3: 112–137.
- Karpman, B (1946). "Psychopathy in the scheme of human typology". Journal of Nervous and Mental Disease. 103: 276–288.
- Karpman, B (1946). "Felonious assault revealed as a symptom of abnormal sexuality; a contribution to the psychogenesis of psychopathic behavior". J Crim Law Criminol (1931). 37: 193–215. PMID 20276265.
- Karpman, B (September 1947). "Dream life in a case of transvestism, with particular attention to the problem of latent homosexuality". J. Nerv. Ment. Dis. 106: 292–337. PMID 20270236.
- Karpman, B (Apr 1947). "Passive parasitic psychopathy: toward the personality structure and psychogenesis of idiopathic psychopathy (anethopathy)". Psychoanal Rev. 34 (2): 198. PMID 20293621.
- Karpman, B (Jul 1947). "Moral agenesis". Psychiatr Q. 21 (3): 361–98. PMID 20265929.
- Karpman, B (1947). "An attempt at a re-evaluation of some concepts of law and psychiatry". J Crim Law Criminol (1931). 38: 206–17. PMID 20266719.
- Karpman, B (Sep 1947). "A psychiatrist looks at the social scientists". Am J Sociol. 53 (2): 131–40. PMID 20257451.
- Karpman (July 1949). "Objective psychotherapy; principles, methods, and results". J Clin Psychol. 5: 193–342. PMID 18139010.
- Karpman, B (1949). "Lying; a minor inquiry into the ethics of neurotic and psychopathic behavior". J Crim Law Criminol (1931). 40: 135–57. PMID 18140421.
- Karpman, B (1948). "Emotional background of white slavery; toward the psychogenesis of so-called psychopathic behavior". J Crim Law Criminol (1931). 39: 1–18. PMID 18873460.
- Karpman, B (1947). "Sex life in prison". J Crim Law Criminol (1931). 38: 475–86. PMID 18901305.
- Karpman, B (1948). "Criminal psychopathology; a brief inventory". Prog Neurol Psychiatry. 3: 451–68. PMID 18872442.
- Karpman, B (July 1948). "Conscience in the psychopath; another version". Am J Orthopsychiatry. 18: 455–91. PMID 18872375.
- Karpman B (1948). The alcoholic woman: case studies in the psychodynamics of alcoholism. Linacre Press ASIN B000RTFUBS
- Karpman, B (March 1948). "The myth of the psychopathic personality". Am J Psychiatry. 104: 523–34. PMID 18911629.
- Karpman, B (Jul 1948). "Coprophilia; a collective review". Psychoanal Rev. 35 (3): 253–72. PMID 18891190.
- Karpman, B (Apr 1948). "The psychopathology of exhibitionism; review of the literature". J Clin Exp Psychopathol. 9 (2): 179–225. PMID 18883866.
- Karpman, B (1949). "Criminality, insanity and the law". J Crim Law Criminol (1931). 39: 584–605. PMID 18127559.
- Karpman B (1949). Symposium on psychopathology. Archives of Criminal Psychodynamics
- Karpman, B (Jul 2000). "The principles and methods of objective psychotherapy". J Clin Psychol. 56 (7): 877–87. PMID 10902947.
- Karpman, B (April 1949). "From the autobiography of a liar; toward the clarification of the problem of psychopathic states". Psychiatr Q. 23: 277; passim. PMID 18137715.
- Karpman, B (July 1949). "A modern Gulliver; a study in coprophilia". Psychoanal Rev. 36: 260; passim. PMID 18147070.
- Karpman, B; Lurie, LA; Lippman, HS; Lourie, RS; Rabinovitch, RD; Allen, FH; Spitz, RA; Anderson, VV (Apr 1950). "The psychopathic delinquent child; Round Table, 1949". Am J Orthopsychiatry. 20 (2): 223–65. PMID 15413689.
- Karpman, B (Jul 1950). "A case of paedophilia (legally rape) cured by psychoanalysis". Psychoanal Rev. 37 (3): 235–76. PMID 15430511.
- Karpman, B (Oct 1950). "Aggression". Am J Orthopsychiatry. 20 (4): 694–718. PMID 14789960.
- Karpman, B (Oct 1951). "Psychosis with psychopathic personality: an untenable diagnosis". Psychiatr Q. 25 (4): 618–40. PMID 14883237.
- Karpman, B (Jun 1951). "The sexual psychopath". J Am Med Assoc. 146 (8): 721–6. PMID 14832048.
- Karpman, B (Oct 1951). "The sexual psychopath. Discussion". Am J Psychother. 5 (4): 584–605. PMID 14878019.
- Karpman, B (Oct 1951). "A psychoanalytic study of a fraternal twin". Am J Orthopsychiatry. 21 (4): 735–55. PMID 14885392.
- Karpman, B (Jul 1951). "A psychoanalytic study of a case of murder". Psychoanal Rev. 38 (3): 245–70. PMID 14864755.
- Karpman, B (Jan 1952). "Insecurity in search of security". Am J Psychother. 6 (1): 23–43. PMID 14894717.
- Karpman, B (Jul 1952). "Dramanalysis". Am J Orthopsychiatry. 22 (3): 570–83. PMID 14943792.
- Karpman, B (Apr 1952). "The psychonomic principle in human behavior". Psychoanal Rev. 39 (2): 168–86. PMID 14941890.
- Karpman, B (Apr 1953). "Dream life in a case of hebephrenia". Psychiatr Q. 27 (2): 262–316. PMID 13056062.
- Karpman, B (Jul 1953). "Psychodynamics in a fraternal twinship relations". Psychoanal Rev. 40 (3): 243–67. PMID 13064343.
- Karpman, B (Jul 1953). "Psychogenic (hysterical) dysphagia; report of a case". Am J Orthopsychiatry. 23 (3): 472–500. PMID 13065398.
- Karpman, B (Mar 1954). "A case of fulminating pyromania". J Nerv Ment Dis. 119 (3): 205–32. PMID 13163694.
- Karpman B (1955). The hangover; a critical study in the psychodynamics of alcoholism Thomas, ASIN B000IB76C6
- Karpman, B (January 1955). "Dream life in a case of pyromania". Psychoanal Rev. 42: 44–60. PMID 14371882.
- Karpman, B (1956). "Criminal Psychodynamics. A Platform". The Journal of Criminal Law, Criminology, and Police. 47: 8–17.
- Karpman, B (1959). "Symposia on child and juvenile delinquency: presented at the American Orthopsychiatric Association". J Am Med Assoc. 171 (5): 624–625.
- Karpman, B (1961). "The structure of neurosis: With special differentials between neurosis, psychosis, homosexuality, alcoholism, psychopathy, and criminality". Archives of Criminal Psychodynamics. 4: 599–646.
- Karpman B (1964). The sexual offender and his offenses: etiology, pathology, psychodynamics, and treatment. Julian Press, ASIN B0007HAB2I
