= History of psychopathy =

Psychopathy, from psych (soul or mind) and pathy (suffering or disease), was coined by German psychiatrists in the 19th century and originally just meant what would today be called mental disorder, the study of which is still known as psychopathology. By the turn of the century 'psychopathic inferiority' referred to the type of mental disorder that might now be termed personality disorder, along with a wide variety of other conditions now otherwise classified. Through the early 20th century this and other terms such as 'constitutional (inborn) psychopaths' or 'psychopathic personalities', were used very broadly to cover anyone who violated legal or moral expectations or was considered inherently socially undesirable in some way.

The term sociopathy was popularized from 1929/30 by the American psychologist George E. Partridge and was originally intended as an alternative term to indicate that the defining feature was a pervasive failure to adhere to societal norms in a way that could harm others. The term psychopathy also gradually narrowed to the latter sense, based on interpretations of the work of a Scottish psychiatrist and especially checklists popularized by an American psychiatrist and later a Canadian psychologist. Psychopathy became defined in these quarters as a constellation of personality traits allegedly associated with immorality, criminality, or in some cases socioeconomic success.

Official psychiatric diagnostic manuals adopted a mixture of approaches, eventually going by the term antisocial or dissocial personality disorder. In the meantime concepts of psychopaths/sociopaths had become notorious among the general public and as characters in fiction.

== Early literature ==
Labels for personality and behavior patterns consistent with psychopathy exist in most cultures. In rural Nigeria, the term Aranakan, was used by the Yoruba people to describe an individual who "always goes his own way regardless of others, who is uncooperative, full of malice, and bullheaded." Similarly, the word Kunlangeta was used by the Inuit to describe "mind knows what to do but does not do it." The psychiatric anthropologist Jane M. Murphy writes that, in northwest Alaska, the term Kunlangeta might be applied to "a man who… repeatedly lies and cheats and steals things and does not go hunting and, when the other men are out of the village, raping many women—someone who does not pay attention to reprimands and who is always brought to the elders for punishment."

Historical descriptions of people or characters are sometimes noted in discussions of psychopathy, with claims of superficial resemblance or retrospective diagnosis — for example, a vignette by Theophrastus in Ancient Greece concerning The Unscrupulous Man. On the other hand, the ancient Greek military statesman Alcibiades has been described as the best example of a probable psychopath – due to inconsistent failures despite his potential and confident speaking. Figures of insanity (e.g. vagabonds, libertines, the "mad") have, at least since the 18th century, often represented an image of darkness and threat to society, as later would "the psychopath" – a mixture of concepts of dangerousness, evil and illness.

== Early clinical concepts ==
Psychiatric concepts began to develop in the early 19th century which to some extent fed into the use of the term psychopathy from the late 19th century, when that term still had a different and far broader meaning than today. In 1801, French psychiatrist Philippe Pinel described without moral judgment patients who appeared mentally unimpaired but who nonetheless engaged in impulsive and self-defeating acts. He described this as insanity without confusion/delusion (manie sans délire), or rational insanity (la folie raisonnante), and his anecdotes generally described people carried away by instinctive fury (instincte fureur). American Benjamin Rush wrote in 1812 about individuals with an apparent "perversion of the moral faculties", which he saw as a sign of innate defective organization. He also saw such people as objects of compassion whose mental alienation could be helped, even if that was in prison or what he referred to as the "Christian system of criminal jurisprudence". In 1835 English psychiatrist James Cowles Prichard, based partly on Pinel's publications, developed a broad category of mental disorder he called moral insanity - a "madness" of emotional or social dispositions without significant delusions or hallucinations. Generally Prichard referred more to eccentric behaviour than, as had Pinel, out of control passions. Prichard's diagnosis came into widespread use in Europe for several decades. None of these concepts are comparable to current specific constructs of psychopathy, or even to the broader category of personality disorders. Moreover, "moral" did not necessarily refer at that time to morality but to the psychological or emotional faculties.

In the latter half of the 19th century the (pseudo) scientific study of individuals thought to lack a conscience flourished. Notably the Italian physician Cesare Lombroso rejected the view that criminality could occur in anyone and sought to identify particular "born criminals" who he thought showed certain physical signs, such as proportionately long arms or a low and narrow forehead. By the beginning of the 20th century the English psychiatrist Henry Maudsley was writing about not just "moral insanity" but the "moral imbecile" and "criminal psychosis", conditions he believed were genetic in origin and impervious to punishment or correction, and which he applied to the lower class of chronic offenders by comparison to "the higher industrial classes".

== First uses of term ==
Initially physicians who specialised in mental disorders might be referred to as psychopaths (e.g. the American Journal of the Medical Sciences in 1864) and their hospitals as psychopathic institutions (compare to the etymologically similar use of the term homeopathic). Treatments of physical conditions by psychological or spiritualist methods might be referred to as psychopathic.

Up until the 1840s, the term psychopathy was also used in a way consistent with its etymology to refer to any illness of the mind. German psychiatrist von Feuchtersleben's (1845) The Principles of Medical Psychology, which was translated into English, used it in this sense, as well as the roughly equivalent new term psychosis, now traced back to Karl Friedrich Canstatt's Handbuch der Medicinischen Klinik (1841). William Griesinger (1868) and Krafft-Ebing (1886) also notably employed the term in distinct ways.

The use of the term in a criminological context was popularised by a high-profile legal case in Russia between 1883 and 1885, concerning the murder of a girl who had previously lived in Britain for some time, Sarah Becker (Sarra Bekker). The owner of the pawnbroker shop in which she worked and where her body was found, a retired military man Mr Mironovich, was eventually convicted on circumstantial evidence and imprisoned. In the meantime, however, a Ms Semenova had handed herself in saying she had killed Becker while trying to steal jewellery with her lover Bezak, a married policeman, though she soon recanted and changed her confession. Semenova was found not guilty following testimony from eminent Russian psychiatrist Prof Ivan M. Balinsky, who described her as a psychopath, still then a very general term. Dictionaries to this day note this as the first use of the noun, via British or American articles which had suggested a known murderer had been released and in some cases that psychopaths should be immediately hanged.

In 1888 Julius Ludwig August Koch first published on his concept of "psychopathic inferiority" (psychopathische Minderwertigkeiten), which would become influential domestically and internationally. He used it to refer to various kinds of dysfunction or strange conduct noted in patients in the absence of obvious mental illness or retardation. Koch was a Christian and also influenced by the degeneration theory popular in Europe at the time, though he referred to both congenital and acquired types. Habitual criminality was only a small part of his concept but the German public soon used the shortened version "inferiors" to refer to anyone supposedly suffering from an inherent ('constitutional') disposition toward crime.

== Early 20th century ==
Some writers would still use psychopathy in the general sense of mental illness, such as Austrian psychiatrist Sigmund Freud in Psychopathic Characters on Stage. By contrast influential German psychiatrist Emil Kraepelin, who had previously included a section on moral insanity in his psychiatric classification scheme, was by 1904 referring to specific psychopathic subtypes all involving antisocial, criminal or dissocial behaviour, including: born criminals (inborn delinquents), liars and swindlers, querulous persons, and driven persons (including vagabonds, spendthrifts, and dipsomaniacs). The influential Adolf Meyer (psychiatrist) spread the concept of constitutional psychopathy when he emigrated to the US, though unlike Koch he separated out cases of what was termed psychoneurosis.

After World War I German psychiatrists dropped the term inferiors/defectives (Minderwertigkeiten) and used psychopathic (psychopathisch) and its derivatives instead, at that time a more neutral term covering a wide range of conditions. Emil Kraepelin, Kurt Schneider and Karl Birnbaum developed categorisation schemes under the heading 'psychopathic personality', only some subtypes of which were thought to have particular links to antisocial behaviour. Schneider in particular advanced the term and tried to formulate it in less judgemental terms than Kraepelin, though infamously defining it as ‘those abnormal personalities who suffer from their abnormality or from whose abnormality society suffers.’ In a similar vein, Birnbaum, a biological psychiatrist, suggested from 1909 a concept similar to sociopathy, implying the social environment could determine whether dispositions became criminal or not.

From 1917 a forerunner to later diagnostic manuals, called the Statistical Manual for the Use of Institutions for the Insane, included a category of 'psychoses with constitutional psychopathic inferiority'. This covered abnormalities in the emotional and volitional spheres associated with episodic disturbances which did not fit into the established categories of psychosis: "The type of behavior disorder, the social reactions, the trends of interests, etc., which the psychopathic inferior may show give special features to many cases, e. g., criminal traits, moral deficiency, tramp life, sexual perversions and various temperamental peculiarities." Constitutional psychopathic inferiority without psychosis was listed separately as one term to apply to patients considered 'Not insane'. Meanwhile, the American Prison Association had its own definition, in which psychopathic personalities were considered non-psychotic and characterized by failure to adjust to environment, lacking purpose, ambition and proper feelings, while often showing tendencies towards delinquency, lying and various eccentricities, perversions or manias (including dromomania (compulsion to travel or experience new lifestyles), kleptomania (stealing), pyromania (fire-setting) etc.). In the UK the Mental Deficiency Act 1913 included the category of moral imbeciles, who were not intellectually idiots but displayed from an early age an alleged mental defect coupled with alleged vicious or criminal propensities, and on whom punishment has little or no deterrent effect. Cyril Burt and others pointed out that 'psychopathic personality' was used in a broader and somewhat different way in America than in the UK.

In the first decades of the 20th century, "constitutional psychopathic inferiority" had become a commonly used term in the US, implying the issue was inherent to the genetics or makeup of the person, an organic disease. As a category it was used to target any and all dysfunctional or antisocial behavior, and in psychiatric categorization it labeled a broad range of alleged mental deviances, including homosexuality. Some courts began to develop "psychopathic laboratories" for the classification and treatment of offenders; the term psychopathic was chosen to avoid the social stigma of "lunacy" or "insanity", while emphasizing variance from normality rather than simply a mental hygiene issue. Nevertheless, at least one such laboratory issued a report on eugenic sterilization initiatives. From the 1930s, "sexual psychopath" laws (a term going back to Krafft-Ebing) started to be implemented in many US states, allowing for the indeterminate psychiatric commitment of sex offenders.

From the late 1920s American psychologist George E. Partridge influentially narrowed the definition of psychopathy to antisocial personality, and from 1930 suggested that a more apt name for it would be sociopathy. He suggested that anyone, and indeed groups of people acting together, could be considered sociopathic at times, but that sociopaths – or technically 'essential sociopaths' - were chronically and pervasively so in their motivation and behavior. In 1933, American Psychiatrist Harry Stack Sullivan first coined the term "Psychopathic child," which is now thought to be the first formulation of autism spectrum disorder, to describe interpersonal deficiency which starts from childhood. Scottish psychiatrist David Henderson published in 1939 a theory of "psychopathic states" which, although he described different types and unusually suggested that psychopaths might not all be criminals, included a violently antisocial type which ended up contributing to that being the popular meaning of the term. In the 1940s a diagnosis of autistic psychopathy was introduced, later coming to wider notice and renamed Asperger syndrome to avoid the stigma of the term psychopathy.

== Mid-20th century ==
The Mask of Sanity by American psychiatrist Hervey M. Cleckley, first published in 1941 and with revised editions for several decades, is considered a seminal work which provided a vivid series of case studies of individuals described as psychopaths. Cleckley proposed 16 characteristics of psychopathy, derived mainly from his work with male psychiatric patients in a locked institution. The title refers to the "mask" of normal functioning that Cleckley thought concealed the disorganization, amorality and disorder of the psychopathic personality. This marked the start in America of the current clinical and popularist conception of psychopathy as a particular type of antisocial, emotionless and criminal character. Cleckley would produce five editions of the book over subsequent decades, including a substantial revision in 1950, expanding his case studies and theories to more non-prisoners and non-criminals.

In Nazi Germany, especially during World War II, psychiatrists and others in programmes such as Action T4 and Action 14f13 systematically deported, sterilised, interned and euthanised patients and prisoners who could be classed as mentally ill, feebleminded, psychopathic, criminally insane or just asocial. In the aftermath of the war, therefore, concepts of antisocial psychopathic personalities fell out of favour in Europe to some extent. At the same time, however, in America and other countries the concept became increasingly prominent, used to categorise allied soldiers as fit or unfit for duty or on return to society, or, conversely, in the more specific sinister sense of the term, as a way to explain the actions of Nazis.

The first version of the American Psychiatric Association's Diagnostic and Statistical Manual of Mental Disorders (DSM) in 1952 did not use the term psychopathy as a diagnosis, but "sociopathic personality disturbance". Individuals to be placed in this category were said to be "...ill primarily in terms of society and of conformity with the prevailing milieu, and not only in terms of personal discomfort and relations with other individuals". There were four subtypes (called 'reactions' after Adolf Meyer): antisocial, dyssocial, sexual and addiction. The antisocial reaction was said to include "individuals who are chronically in trouble and do not seem to change as a result of experience or punishment, with no loyalties to anyone", as well as being frequently callous and lacking responsibility, with an ability to 'rationalize' their behaviour. The dyssocial reaction was for "individuals who disregard societal rules, although they are capable of strong loyalties to others or groups." Although the sociopathy category was very broad by today's definitions, the DSM-I itself pointed out that it was more specific and limited than the then current notions of 'constitutional psychopathic state' or 'psychopathic personality'.

Meanwhile, other subtypes of psychopathy were sometimes proposed, notably by psychoanalyst Benjamin Karpman from the 1940s. He described psychopathy due to psychological problems (e.g. psychotic, hysterical or neurotic conditions) and idiopathic psychopathy where there was no obvious psychological cause, concluding that the former could not be attributed to a psychopathic personality and that the latter appeared so absent of any redeeming features that it couldn't be seen as a personality issue either but must be a constitutional "anethopathy" (amorality or antipathy). Various theories of distinctions between primary and secondary psychopathy remain to this day.

Cleckley's concept of psychopathy as expanded on in new editions of his book, particularly the sense of a conscience-less man beneath a mask of normality, caught the public imagination around this time. It also became increasingly influential in psychiatric circles. It later fell out of favor for some time, however, such that when he died in 1984 he was better remembered for a vivid case study of a female patient published in 1956, turned into a movie The Three Faces of Eve in 1957, which had (re)popularized in America another controversial diagnosis, multiple personality disorder.

A sociologist reviewing the field in 1958 wrote that "Without exception, on every point regarding psychopathic personality, psychiatrists present varying or contradictory views."

Nevertheless, criminologist sociologists William and Joan McCord were influential in narrowing the definition of psychopathy in some quarters to mean an antisocial lack of guilt accompanied by reactive aggression. From another direction, sociologist Lee Robins was also an influential figure in sociopathy research, stemming largely from her research-based 1966 book 'Deviant Children Grown Up: a sociological and psychiatric study of sociopathic personality', based on operational criteria provided by Eli Robins, which would shape the later diagnosis of Antisocial Personality Disorder.

In the Mental Health Act in England, a new category of 'Psychopathic Personality' was added in 1959, renamed Psychopathic Disorder in 1983 (then in 2007 removed entirely). This was a legal subcategory in addition to 'mental illness' which did not equate to any one psychiatric diagnosis but covered anyone with "a persistent disorder or disability of mind which results in abnormally aggressive or seriously irresponsible conduct."

On the other hand, various analysts began to identify "successful" psychopaths in society, some even suggesting it was but an adaption to the social or economic mores of the age, others noting they could be hard to spot either because they were so good at hiding their lack of conscience, or because many people showed the traits to some degree.

== Late 20th century ==
In 1968 the second edition of the DSM, in place of the antisocial subtype of sociopathic personality disturbance, listed "antisocial personality" as one of ten personality disorders. This was still described in similar terms as the DSM-I's category, for individuals who are "basically unsocialized", in repeated conflicts with society, incapable of significant loyalty, selfish, irresponsible, unable to feel guilt or learn from prior experiences, and tend to blame others and rationalise. It warned that a history of legal or social offenses was not by itself enough to justify the diagnosis and that a 'group delinquent reaction' of childhood or adolescence or 'social maladjustment without manifest psychiatric disorder' should be ruled out first. The dyssocial type from the DSM-I was relegated, though would resurface as the main diagnosis in the ICD manual of the World Health Organization.

In 1974 (and republished in 1984) clinical psychologist Bobby E. Wright wrote about 'The Psychopathic Racial Personality', in which he suggested that negative aspects of the overall behavior of white peoples towards non-white peoples could be understood by seeing the former as displaying psychopathic traits – involving predatory behavior and senseless destruction combined with ability to persuade.

There remained no international clinical agreement on the diagnosis of psychopathy. A 1977 study found little relationship with the characteristics commonly attributed to psychopaths and concluded that the concept was being used too widely and loosely. Robert D. Hare had published a book in 1970 summarizing research on psychopathy, and was subsequently at the forefront of psychopathy research. Frustrated by a lack of agreed definitions or rating systems for psychopathy, including at a ten-day international North Atlantic Treaty Organization (NATO) conference in 1975, Hare began developing a Psychopathy Checklist. Produced for initial circulation in 1980, it was based largely on the list of traits advanced by Cleckley and partly on the theories of other authors and on his own experiences with clients in prisons. Meanwhile, a DSM-III task force instead developed the diagnosis of antisocial personality disorder, based on 1972 Feighner Criteria for research and published in the DSM in 1980. This was based on some of the criteria put forward by Cleckley but operationalized in behavioral rather than personality terms, more specifically related to conduct. APA was most concerned to demonstrate inter-rater reliability rather than necessarily validity.

Nevertheless, one author referred to the concept of psychopathy in 1987 as an "infinitely elastic, catch-all category". In 1988, psychologist Blackburn wrote in the British Journal of Psychiatry that as commonly used in psychiatry it is little more than a moral judgment masquerading as a clinical diagnosis, and should be scrapped. Ellard argued similarly in the same year in the Australian and New Zealand Journal of Psychiatry, describing the concept as 'a reflection of the customs and prejudices of a particular social group. Most psychiatrists are from that group and therefore fail to see the incongruity.' By the 1970s and 80s the sexual psychopath laws were falling out of favor in many states; the Group for the Advancement of Psychiatry called them a failure based on a confusing label mixing law and psychiatry.

Hare redrafted his checklist in 1985 (Cleckley had died in 1984), renaming it the Hare Psychopathy Checklist Revised and finalising it as a first edition in 1991, updated with extra data in a 2nd edition in 2003. Hare's list differed from Cleckley's not just in rewordings and introducing quantitative scores for each point. Cleckley had required an absence of delusions and an absence of nervousness, which was central to how he defined psychopathy, whereas neither were mentioned in Hare's list. Hare also left out mention of suicidality being rarely completed and behavior with alcohol. Moreover, while Cleckley only listed "inadequately motivated antisocial behavior", Hare turned this into an array of specific antisocial behaviors covering a person's whole life, including juvenile delinquency, parasitic lifestyle, poor behavioural controls, and criminal versatility. Blackburn has noted that overall Hare's checklist is closer to the criminological concept of the McCords than that of Cleckley. Hare himself, while noting his promotion of Cleckley's work for four decades, would subsequently distance himself from it to some extent.

Meanwhile, following some criticism over the lack of psychological criteria in the DSM, further studies were conducted leading up the DSM-IV in 1994 and some personality criteria were included as "associated features" which were outlined in the text. The World Health Organization's ICD incorporated a similar diagnosis of Dissocial Personality Disorder. Both state that psychopathy (or sociopathy) may be considered synonyms of their diagnosis.

Hare wrote two bestsellers on psychopathy, "Without Conscience" in 1993 and "Snakes in Suits: When Psychopaths Go to Work" (co-written with organisational psychologist Paul Babiak, who was listed as first author) in 2006. Cleckley had described psychopathic patients as "carr[ying] disaster lightly in each hand" and "not deeply vicious", but Hare presented a more malevolent picture; the "mask of sanity" had acquired a more sinister meaning.

== 21st century ==
In 2002 an academic dispute arose around claims and counterclaims of racism in the use of the concept of psychopathy. British psychologist Richard Lynn claimed that some races were inherently more psychopathic than others, while other psychologists criticized his data and interpretations.

The Federal Bureau of Investigation's monthly outreach and communication bulletin focused on psychopathy in June 2012, featuring articles introduced and co-authored by the main contemporary proponent of the construct, Robert D. Hare.

Columbia University forensic psychiatrist Michael H. Stone considered that not all psychopaths were dangerous to others, calling them instead "con artists." Stone weighed the issue of sadism when classifying psychopathic killers on his scale of evil, giving much importance to premeditation and the infliction of torture on the victim. He takes many examples of these cases in his 2009 book The Anatomy of Evil.

The DSM-5 published in 2013 had criteria for an overall diagnosis of Antisocial (Dissocial) Personality Disorder similar to DSM-IV, still noting that it has also been known as psychopathy or sociopathy. In an 'alternative model' suggested at the end of the manual, there is an optional specifier for "psychopathic features" - where there is a lack of anxiety/fear accompanied by a bold and efficacious interpersonal style.

== Overall trends ==
One exhaustive analysis by a Canadian psychologist describes the various lines of work as 'a psychopathy project' attempting to establish psychopathy as an object of science. Overall this was found to have suffered from 'a number of serious logical confusions and deliberate mischaracterizations of its scientific merits' - including its early basis in degeneration theory, tautological definitions and associated neuroscience findings, routinely unclarified assumptions and shifting levels of explanation about the core concept, and exaggerated statistical claims such as based on Hare's use of factor analysis. It was noted, however, that some of the limited research findings may prove useful in a better explanatory framework (i.e. not necessarily under the umbrella of 'psychopathy').

Swedish sociologist Roland Paulsen has further placed the more recent resurgence in popular coverage of psychopathy in the context of "the Enlightenment project" to use rationality and technology to deal with problems in human life and society. A Scottish sociologist of biomedical ethics has suggested that the DSM's attempt to develop different standards for Antisocial Personality Disorder have been limited and modified by path dependence on the concept of psychopathy/sociopathy, due to the latter being embedded in diverse sociotechnological networks and thereby demanded by various users.

== See also ==
- History of mental disorders
