= Antisocial personality disorder =

Personality disorder

- Other names: Sociopathy, dissocial personality disorder
- Specialty: Psychiatry
- Symptoms: Pervasive deviance, deception, impulsivity, irritability, aggression, recklessness, manipulation, callous and unemotional traits, feelings of contempt
- Usual onset: Childhood or early adolescence
- Duration: Long term
- Risk factors: Family history
- Differential diagnosis: Psychopathy, conduct disorder, attention deficit hyperactivity disorder, narcissistic personality disorder, substance use disorder, bipolar disorder, borderline personality disorder, schizophrenia, criminal behavior, oppositional defiant disorder
- Prognosis: Poor
- Frequency: 0.2% to 3.3% in a given year

Antisocial personality disorder (ASPD) is a personality disorder defined by a chronic pattern of behavior that disregards the rights and well-being of others. People with ASPD often exhibit behavior that conflicts with social norms, leading to issues with interpersonal relationships, employment, and legal matters. The condition generally manifests in childhood or early adolescence (before the age of 15), with a high rate of associated conduct problems and a tendency for symptoms to peak in late adolescence and early adulthood.

The prognosis for ASPD is complex, with high variability in outcomes. Individuals with severe ASPD symptoms may have difficulty forming stable relationships, maintaining employment, and avoiding criminal behavior, resulting in higher rates of divorce, unemployment, homelessness, and incarceration. In extreme cases, ASPD may lead to violent or criminal behaviors, often escalating in early adulthood. Research indicates that individuals with ASPD have an elevated risk of suicide, particularly those who also engage in substance misuse or have a history of incarceration. Additionally, children raised by parents with ASPD may be at greater risk of delinquency and mental health issues themselves.

Although ASPD is a persistent and often lifelong condition, symptoms may diminish over time, particularly after age 40, though only a small percentage of individuals experience significant improvement. Many individuals with ASPD have co-occurring issues such as substance use disorders, mood disorders, or other personality disorders. Research on pharmacological treatment for ASPD is limited, with no medications approved specifically for the disorder. However, certain psychiatric medications, including antipsychotics, antidepressants, and mood stabilizers, may help manage symptoms like aggression and impulsivity in some cases, or treat co-occurring disorders.

The diagnostic criteria and understanding of ASPD have evolved significantly over time. Early diagnostic manuals, such as the DSM-I in 1952, described "sociopathic personality disturbance" as involving a range of antisocial behaviors linked to societal and environmental factors. Subsequent editions of the DSM have refined the diagnosis, eventually distinguishing ASPD in the DSM-III (1980) with a more structured checklist of observable behaviors. Current definitions in the DSM-5 align with the clinical description of ASPD as a pattern of disregard for the rights of others, with potential overlap in traits associated with psychopathy.

== Signs and symptoms ==
Due to tendencies toward recklessness and impulsivity, patients with ASPD are at a higher risk of drug and alcohol abuse. ASPD is the personality disorder most likely to be associated with addiction. Individuals with ASPD are at a higher risk of illegal drug usage, blood-borne diseases, HIV, shorter periods of abstinence, misuse of oral administrations, and compulsive gambling as a consequence of their tendency towards addiction. In addition, sufferers are more likely to abuse substances or develop an addiction at a young age.

Due to ASPD being associated with higher levels of impulsivity, suicidality, and irresponsible behavior, the condition is correlated with heightened levels of aggressive behavior, domestic violence, illegal drug use, pervasive anger, and violent crimes. This behavior typically has negative effects on their education, relationships, and employment. Alongside this, sexual behaviors of risk such as having multiple sexual partners in a short period of time, seeing prostitutes, trading sex for drugs, and frequent unprotected sex, are also common.

Patients with ASPD have been documented to describe emotions with ambivalence and experience heightened states of emotional coldness and detachment. Individuals with ASPD, or who display antisocial behavior, may often experience chronic boredom. People with ASPD may have a limited capacity for empathy and can be more interested in benefiting themselves than avoiding harm to others. They may have no regard for morals, social norms, or the rights of others. People with ASPD can have difficulty beginning or sustaining relationships. It is common for the interpersonal relationships of someone with ASPD to revolve around the exploitation and abuse of others. People with ASPD may display arrogance, think lowly and negatively of others, have limited remorse for their harmful actions, and have a callous attitude toward those they have harmed.

People with ASPD can have difficulty mentalizing, or interpreting the mental state of others. Alternatively, they may display a perfectly intact theory of mind, or the ability to understand one's mental state, but have an impaired ability to understand how another individual may be affected by an aggressive action. These factors might contribute to aggressive and criminal behavior as well as empathy deficits. Despite this, they may be adept at social cognition, or the ability to process and store information about other people, which can contribute to an increased ability to manipulate others.

ASPD is highly prevalent among prisoners. People with ASPD tend to be convicted more, receive longer sentences, and are more likely to be charged with almost any crime, with assault and other violent crimes being the most common charges. Those who have committed violent crimes tend to have higher levels of testosterone than the average person, also contributing to the higher likelihood for men to be diagnosed with ASPD. The effect of testosterone is counteracted by cortisol, which facilitates the cognitive control of impulsive tendencies.

Shoplifting, arson, and the destruction of others' property are also behaviors commonly associated with ASPD. Alongside other conduct problems, all people with ASPD had conduct disorder in their youth, characterized by a pervasive pattern of violent, criminal, defiant, and anti-social behavior. Evidence of conduct disorder in adolescence is a requirement for a diagnosis of ASPD in adults.

Although behaviors vary by degree, individuals with this personality disorder have been known to exploit others in harmful ways for their own gain or pleasure, and frequently manipulate and deceive other people. While some do so with a façade of superficial charm, others do so through intimidation and violence. Individuals with antisocial personality disorder may deliberately show irresponsibility, have difficulty acknowledging their faults or attempt to redirect attention away from harmful behaviors.

== Causes ==
Personality disorders are generally believed to be caused by a combination and interaction of genetics and environmental influences. People with an antisocial or alcoholic parent are considered to be at higher risk of developing ASPD. Fire-setting and cruelty to animals during childhood are also linked to the development of an antisocial personality disorder.

According to professor Emily Simonoff of the Institute of Psychiatry, Psychology and Neuroscience, there are many variables that are consistently connected to ASPD, such as: childhood hyperactivity and conduct disorder, criminality in adulthood, lower IQ scores, and reading problems. Additionally, children who grow up with a predisposition of ASPD and interact with other delinquent children are likely to later be diagnosed with ASPD.

=== Genetic ===
Research into genetic associations in antisocial personality disorder suggests that ASPD has some or even a strong genetic basis. The prevalence of ASPD is higher in people related to someone with the disorder. Twin studies, which are designed to discern between genetic and environmental effects, have reported significant genetic influences on antisocial behavior and conduct disorder.

In the specific genes that may be involved, one gene that has shown particular promise in its correlation with ASPD is the gene that encodes for monoamine oxidase A (MAO-A), an enzyme that breaks down monoamine neurotransmitters such as serotonin and norepinephrine. Various studies examining the gene's relationship to behavior have suggested that variants of the gene resulting in less MAO-A being produced (such as the 2R and 3R alleles of the promoter region) have associations with aggressive behavior in men.

This association is also influenced by negative experiences early in life, with children possessing a low-activity variant (MAOA-L) who have experienced negative circumstances being more likely to develop antisocial behavior than those with the high-activity variant (MAOA-H). Even when environmental interactions (e.g., emotional abuse) are taken out of the equation, a small association between MAOA-L and aggressive and antisocial behavior remains.

The gene that encodes for the serotonin transporter (SLC6A4), a gene that is heavily researched for its associations with other mental disorders, is another gene of interest in antisocial behavior and personality traits. Genetic association studies have suggested that the short "S" allele is associated with impulsive antisocial behavior and ASPD in the inmate population.

However, research into psychopathy find that the long "L" allele is associated with the Factor 1 traits of psychopathy, which describes its core affective (e.g. lack of empathy, fearlessness) and interpersonal (e.g. grandiosity, manipulativeness) personality disturbances. This is suggestive of two different forms of the disorder, one associated more with impulsive behavior and emotional dysregulation, and the other with predatory aggression and affective disturbance.

Various other gene candidates for ASPD have been identified by a genome-wide association study published in 2016. Several of these gene candidates are shared with attention-deficit hyperactivity disorder, with which ASPD is often comorbid. The study found that those who carry four mutations on chromosome 6 are 50% more likely to develop antisocial personality disorder than those who do not.

=== Physiological ===
==== Hormones and neurotransmitters ====
Traumatic events can disrupt the standard development of the central nervous system, which can generate a release of hormones that can change normal patterns of development.

One of the neurotransmitters that has been discussed in individuals with ASPD is serotonin, also known as 5-HT. A meta-analysis of 20 studies found significantly lower 5-HIAA levels (indicating lower serotonin levels), especially in those who are younger than 30 years of age.

While it has been shown that lower levels of serotonin may be associated with ASPD, there has also been evidence that decreased serotonin function is highly correlated with impulsiveness and aggression across a number of different experimental paradigms. Impulsivity is not only linked with irregularities in 5-HT metabolism but may be the most essential psychopathological aspect linked with such dysfunction. Correspondingly, the DSM classifies "impulsivity or failure to plan ahead" and "irritability and aggressiveness" as two of seven sub-criteria in category A of the diagnostic criteria of ASPD.

Some studies have found a relationship between monoamine oxidase A and antisocial behavior, including conduct disorder and symptoms of adult ASPD, in maltreated children.

==== Neurological ====
Antisocial behavior may be related to a number of neurological defects, such as head trauma. Antisocial behavior is associated with decreased grey matter in the right lentiform nucleus, left insular, and frontopolar cortex. Increased volumes of grey matter have been observed in the right fusiform gyrus, inferior parietal cortex, right cingulate gyrus, and post-central cortex.

Intellectual and cognitive ability is often found to be impaired or reduced in the ASPD population. Contrary to stereotypes in popular culture of the "psychopathic genius", antisocial personality disorder is associated with reduced overall intelligence and specific reductions in individual aspects of cognitive ability. These deficits also occur in general-population samples of people with antisocial traits and in children with the precursors to antisocial personality disorder.

People who exhibit antisocial behavior tend to demonstrate decreased activity in the prefrontal cortex, and is more apparent in functional neuroimaging as opposed to structural neuroimaging. Some investigators have questioned whether the reduced volume in prefrontal regions is associated with antisocial personality disorder, or whether they result from co-morbid disorders, such as substance use disorder or childhood maltreatment. It is still considered an open question if the anatomical abnormality causes the psychological and behavioral abnormality, or vice versa.

Antisocial behavior is also associated with structural brain differences. Some of the major areas involved are areas of the prefrontal cortex, such as the right frontal and temporal cortices, the ventromedial prefrontal cortex, and the middle and orbitofrontal cortices. In these areas, a reduction in gray matter is seen in individuals with antisocial personality disorder, suggesting these structural differences may play a role in their behavior. Reduced gray-matter volumes in these areas are in fact associated with a lack of emotional regulation, a lack of behavioral and response inhibition, and poor decision making among other affects. Additionally, those with ASPD have shown decreased gray matter volumes in other brain areas such as the amygdala and insula, suggesting possible issues with emotional reactions to certain stimuli. People that exhibit antisocial behavior also tend to demonstrate decreased activity in the prefrontal cortex, as is apparent in functional neuroimaging.

Cavum septi pellucidi (CSP) is a marker for limbic neural maldevelopment, and its presence has been loosely associated with certain mental disorders, such as schizophrenia and post-traumatic stress disorder. One study found that those with CSP had significantly higher levels of antisocial personality, psychopathy, arrests and convictions compared with controls.

=== Environmental ===
==== Family environment ====
Many studies suggest that the social and home environment contribute to the development of ASPD. Parents of children with ASPD may display antisocial behavior themselves, which is then adopted by their children. A lack of parental stimulation and affection during early development can lead to high levels of cortisol with the absence of balancing hormones such as oxytocin.

This disrupts and overloads the child's stress response systems, which is thought to lead to underdevelopment of the part of the child's brain that deals with emotion, empathy, and the ability to connect to other humans on an emotional level. According to Dr. Bruce Perry in his book The Boy Who Was Raised as a Dog, "the infant's developing brain needs to be patterned, repetitive stimuli to develop properly. Spastic, unpredictable relief from fear, loneliness, discomfort, and hunger keeps a baby's stress system on high alert. An environment of intermittent care punctuated by total abandonment may be the worst of all worlds for a child."

==== Parenting styles ====
Some hypothesize that parenting styles can affect how children experience and develop in their youth, and can have an impact on a child's diagnosis of ASPD.

==== Childhood trauma ====
ASPD is highly comorbid with emotional and physical abuse in childhood. Physical neglect also correlates significantly with ASPD. The way a child bonds with its parents early in life is important. Poor parental bonding due to abuse or neglect puts children at greater risk for developing antisocial personality disorder. There is also a significant correlation with parental overprotection and people who develop ASPD.

Those with ASPD may have experienced any of the following forms of childhood trauma or abuse: physical or sexual abuse, neglect, coercion, abandonment or separation from caregivers, violence in a community, acts of terror, bullying, or life-threatening incidents. Some symptoms can mimic other forms of mental illness, such as:

- post-traumatic stress disorder (symptoms of upsetting/terrifying memories of traumatic events)
- reactive attachment disorder (little to no response regarding emotional triggers)
- disinhibited social engagement disorder (roaming off with people you don't know without caregivers being informed)
- dissociative identity disorder (disconnection from self or environment)

The comorbidity rate of the previously listed disorders with ASPD is notably elevated.

==== Cultural influences ====
The sociocultural perspective of clinical psychology views disorders as influenced by cultural aspects; since cultural norms differ significantly, mental disorders (such as ASPD) are viewed differently. Robert D. Hare suggested that the rise in ASPD that has been reported in the United States may be linked to changes in cultural norms, serving to validate the behavioral tendencies of many individuals with ASPD. While the rise reported may be in part a byproduct of the widening use (and abuse) of diagnostic techniques, given Eric Berne's division between individuals with active and latent ASPD – the latter keeping themselves in check by attachment to an external source of control like the law, traditional standards, or religion – it has been suggested that the erosion of collective standards may serve to release the individual with latent ASPD from their previously prosocial behavior.

There is also a continuous debate as to the extent to which the legal system should be involved in the identification and admittance of patients with preliminary symptoms of ASPD. Controversial clinical psychiatrist Pierre-Édouard Carbonneau suggested that the problem with legal forced admittance is the rate of failure when diagnosing ASPD. He contends that the possibility of diagnosing and coercing a patient into prescribing medication to someone without ASPD, but is diagnosed with ASPD, could be potentially disastrous. But the possibility of not diagnosing ASPD and seeing a patient go untreated because of a lack of sufficient evidence of cultural or environmental influences is something a psychiatrist must ignore; and in his words, "play it safe".

=== Conduct disorder ===
While antisocial personality disorder is a mental disorder diagnosed in adulthood, it has its precedent in childhood. The DSM-5's criteria for ASPD require that the individual have conduct problems evident by the age of 15. Persistent antisocial behavior, as well as a lack of regard for others in childhood and adolescence, is known as conduct disorder and is the precursor of ASPD. About 25–40% of youths with conduct disorder will be diagnosed with ASPD in adulthood.

Conduct disorder (CD) is a disorder diagnosed in childhood that parallels the characteristics found in ASPD. It is characterized by a repetitive and persistent pattern of behavior in which the basic rights of others or major age-appropriate norms are violated by the child. Children with the disorder often display impulsive and aggressive behavior, may be callous and deceitful, may repeatedly engage in petty crime (such as stealing or vandalism), or get into fights with other children and adults.

This behavior is typically persistent and may be difficult to deter with either threat or punishment. Attention deficit hyperactivity disorder (ADHD) is common in this population, and children with the disorder may also engage in substance use. CD is distinct from oppositional defiant disorder (ODD) in that children with ODD do not commit aggressive or antisocial acts against other people, animals, or property, though many children diagnosed with ODD are subsequently re-diagnosed with CD.

Two developmental courses for CD have been identified based on the age at which the symptoms become present. The first course is known as the "childhood-onset type" and occurs when conduct disorder symptoms are present before the age of 10. This course is often linked to a more persistent life course and more pervasive behaviors, and children in this group express greater levels of ADHD symptoms, neuropsychological deficits, more academic problems, increased family dysfunction, and higher likelihood of aggression and violence.

The second course is known as the "adolescent-onset type" and occurs when conduct disorder develops after the age of 10 years. Compared to the childhood-onset type, less impairment in various cognitive and emotional functions are present, and the adolescent-onset variety may remit by adulthood. In addition to this differentiation, the DSM-5 provides a specifier for a callous and unemotional interpersonal style, which reflects characteristics seen in psychopathy and are believed to be a childhood precursor to this disorder. Compared to the adolescent-onset subtype, the childhood-onset subtype tends to have a worse treatment outcome, especially if callous and unemotional traits are present.

== Diagnosis ==
=== Classification ===
Classification of personality disorders differs significantly between the two most prominent frameworks for classification of mental disorders, namely: the Diagnostic and Statistical Manual of Mental Disorders and the International Classification of Diseases, the most recent editions of which are the DSM-5-TR and ICD-11, respectively. While personality disorders, including ASPD, are diagnosed as separate entities in the DSM-5; in the ICD-11 classification of personality disorders, they are assessed in terms of severity levels, with trait and pattern specifiers serving to characterize the particular style of pathology. There is also a hybrid model, called the Alternative DSM-5 model for personality disorders (AMPD), which defines ASPD and five other PDs through disorder-specific combinations of pathological traits and areas of overall impairment.

==== DSM-5 ====
In the main section (section II) of the DSM-5, a categorical classification with ten specific categories of personality disorder was retained from the DSM-IV. Among these, antisocial personality disorder is defined as being characterized by at least three of seven traits. In order to be diagnosed with antisocial personality disorder under the DSM-5, one must be at least 18 years old, show evidence of onset of conduct disorder before age 15, and antisocial behavior cannot be explained by schizophrenia or bipolar disorder. This categorical system has faced criticism for problems such as excessive comorbidity among personality disorders, heterogeneity within categories, and the use of the often most correct but uninformative personality disorder-not otherwise specified (PD-NOS) diagnosis.

In response to problems associated with the categorical system, the DSM-5 Personality and Personality Disorders Work Group devised the AMPD. This model bases diagnosis on the level of personality functioning (criterion A) as well as presence of pathological personality traits (criterion B) in a patient, with specific personality disorders being characterized by certain combinations of these. Personality functioning comprises self functioning (identity and self-direction) and interpersonal functioning (empathy and intimacy); for example, in the case of ASPD, characteristic impairment in the identity domain is described as follows: "Egocentrism; self-esteem derived from personal gain, power, or pleasure". Serving to characterize the pathological aspects of the personality giving rise to the impairment in personality functioning, criterion B requires that at least six out of seven pathological traits be present in order for a diagnosis to be made. In the case of ASPD, the aforementioned traits belong to the domains of antagonism and disinhibition.

The AMPD diagnosis can be further specified using a "with psychopathic traits" specifier modelled after the Fearless Dominance scale of the Psychopathic Personality Inventory, defined by low Anxiousness and Withdrawal and high Attention-Seeking. Researchers have also proposed the inclusion of Grandiosity and Restricted Affectivity to better capture psychopathy. Moreover, the individual must be at least 18 years old, and meet the AMPD's additional criteria (C–G), such as differentiation from other conditions.

==== ICD-11 ====
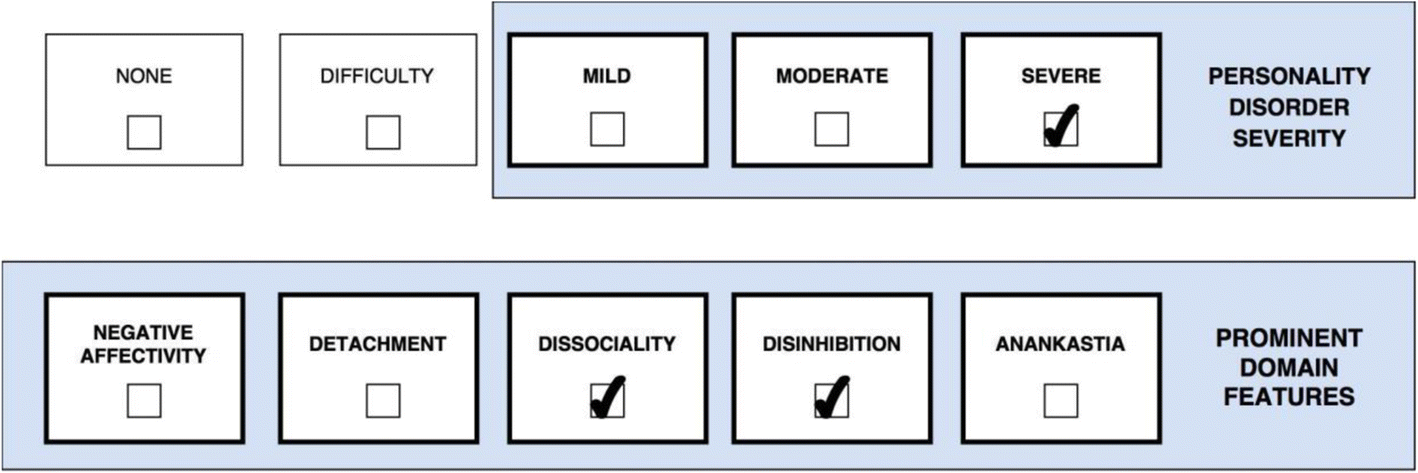
A person eligible for Dissocial PD diagnosis in accordance with the ICD-10 could have a presentation classified like this in accordance with the ICD-11.

The World Health Organization's ICD-11 has replaced the categorical classification of personality disorders in the ICD-10 with a dimensional model containing a unified personality disorder (6D10) with severity specifiers, along with specifiers for prominent personality traits or patterns (6D11). Severity is assessed based on the pervasiveness of impairment in several areas of functioning, as well as on the level of distress and harm caused by the disorder, while trait and pattern specifiers are used for recording the manner in which the disturbance is manifested.

Dissocial personality disorder has been found to be consistently associated with the ICD-11 trait domains Dissociality (6D11.2) and Disinhibition (6D11.3), reflecting core features such as callousness, lack of remorse, impulsivity, and risk-taking. Some evidence also points to a negative association with Negative Affectivity (6D11.0), consistent with traits like fearlessness and boldness. In the categorical classification of the ICD-10, dissocial personality disorder (F60.2) was a distinct personality disorder diagnosis.

=== Psychopathy ===
Psychopathy is commonly defined as a personality construct characterized partly by antisocial behavior, a diminished capacity for empathy and remorse, and poor behavioral controls. Psychopathic traits are assessed using various measurement tools, including Canadian researcher Robert D. Hare's Psychopathy Checklist, Revised (PCL-R). "Psychopathy" is not the official title of any diagnosis in the DSM or ICD, nor is it an official title used by any other major psychiatric organizations. The DSM and ICD, however, state that their antisocial diagnoses are at times referred to (or include what is referred to) as psychopathy or sociopathy.

American psychiatrist Hervey Cleckley's work on psychopathy formed the basis of the diagnostic criteria for ASPD, and the DSM states ASPD is often referred to as psychopathy. However, critics argue ASPD is not synonymous with psychopathy as the diagnostic criteria are not the same, since criteria relating to personality traits are emphasized relatively less in the former. These differences exist in part because it was believed such traits were difficult to measure reliably and it was "easier to agree on the behaviors that typify a disorder than on the reasons why they occur".

Although the diagnosis of ASPD covers two to three times as many prisoners as the diagnosis of psychopathy, Robert Hare believes the PCL-R is better able to predict future criminality, violence, and recidivism than a diagnosis of ASPD. He suggests there are differences between PCL-R-diagnosed psychopaths and non-psychopaths on "processing and use of linguistic and emotional information", while such differences are potentially smaller between those diagnosed with ASPD and without. Additionally, Hare argued that confusion regarding how to diagnose ASPD, confusion regarding the difference between ASPD and psychopathy, as well as the differing future prognoses regarding recidivism and treatability, may have serious consequences in settings such as court cases where psychopathy is often seen as aggravating the crime.

Nonetheless, psychopathy has been proposed as a specifier under an alternative model for ASPD. In the DSM-5, under "Alternative DSM-5 Model for Personality Disorders", ASPD with psychopathic features is described as characterized by "a lack of anxiety or fear and by a bold interpersonal style that may mask maladaptive behaviors (e.g., fraudulence)". Low levels of withdrawal and high levels of attention-seeking combined with low anxiety are associated with "social potency" and "stress immunity" in psychopathy. Under the specifier, affective and interpersonal characteristics are comparatively emphasized over behavioral components. Research suggests that, even without the "with psychopathic traits" specifier, these Section III criteria accurately capture the affective-interpersonal features of psychopathy, though the specifier increases coverage of the Interpersonal and Lifestyle facets of the PCL-R.

=== Millon's subtypes ===
Theodore Millon suggested 5 subtypes of ASPD. However, these constructs are not recognized in the DSM or ICD.

Subtype	Features	Traits
Nomadic antisocial	Including schizoid and avoidant features	Feels jinxed, ill-fated, doomed, and cast aside; peripheral, drifters; gypsy-like roamers, vagrants; dropouts and misfits; intinerant vagabonds, tramps, wanderers; impulsively not benign
Malevolent antisocial	Including sadistic and paranoid features	Belligerent, mordant, rancorous, vicious, malignant, brutal, resentful; anticipates betrayal and punishment; desires revenge; truculent, callous, fearless; guiltless
Covetous antisocial	variant of “pure” pattern	Feels intentionally denied and deprived; rapacious, begrudging, discontentedly yearning; envious, seeks retribution, and avariciously greedy; pleasure more in taking than in having.
Risk-taking antisocial	Including histrionic features	Dauntless, venturesome, intrepid, bold, audacious, daring; reckless, foolhardy, heedless; unfazed by hazard; pursues perilous ventures.
Reputation-defending antisocial	Including narcissistic features	Needs to be thought of as infallible, unbreakable, indomitable, formidable, inviolable; intransigent when status is questioned; overreactive to slights.

Elsewhere, Millon differentiates ten subtypes (partially overlapping with the above) – covetous, risk-taking, malevolent, tyrannical, malignant, disingenuous, explosive, and abrasive – but specifically stresses that "the number 10 is by no means special ... Taxonomies may be put forward at levels that are more coarse or more fine-grained."

== Treatment ==
ASPD is considered to be among the most difficult personality disorders to treat. Rendering an effective treatment for ASPD is further complicated due to the inability to look at comparative studies between psychopathy and ASPD due to differing diagnostic criteria, differences in defining and measuring outcomes and a focus on treating incarcerated patients rather than those in the community. Because of their very low or absent capacity for remorse, individuals with ASPD often lack sufficient motivation and fail to see the costs associated with antisocial acts. They may only simulate remorse rather than truly commit to change: they can be charming and dishonest, and may manipulate staff and fellow patients during treatment. Studies have shown that outpatient therapy is not likely to be successful, but the extent to which persons with ASPD are entirely unresponsive to treatment may have been exaggerated.

Most treatment done is for those in the criminal justice system to whom the treatment regimes are given as part of their imprisonment. Those with ASPD may stay in treatment only as required by an external source, such as parole conditions. Residential programs that provide a carefully controlled environment of structure and supervision along with peer confrontation have been recommended. There has been some research on the treatment of ASPD that indicated positive results for therapeutic interventions.

=== Psychotherapy ===
Psychotherapy, also known as "talk" therapy, has been found to help treat patients with ASPD. Schema therapy is also being investigated as a treatment for ASPD. A review by Charles M. Borduin features the strong influence of multisystemic therapy (MST) that could potentially improve this issue. However, this treatment requires complete cooperation and participation of all family members. Some studies have found that the presence of ASPD does not significantly interfere with treatment for other disorders, such as substance use, although others have reported contradictory findings. Recently, Mentalization Based Treatment, a psychodynamically oriented therapy for personality disorders, has been shown to be potentially effective in reducing aggression in patients with ASPD under probation.

Therapists working with individuals with ASPD may have considerable negative feelings toward patients with extensive histories of aggressive, exploitative, and abusive behaviors. Rather than attempt to develop a sense of conscience in these individuals, which is extremely difficult considering the nature of the disorder, therapeutic techniques are focused on rational and utilitarian arguments against repeating past offenses. These approaches would focus on the tangible, material value of prosocial behavior and abstaining from antisocial behavior. However, the impulsive and aggressive nature of those with this disorder may limit the effectiveness of this form of therapy.

=== Medication ===
The use of medications in treating antisocial personality disorder is still poorly explored, and no medications have been approved by the FDA to specifically treat ASPD. A 2020 Cochrane review of studies that explored the use of pharmaceuticals in ASPD patients, of which eight studies met the selection criteria for review, concluded that the current body of evidence was inconclusive for recommendations concerning the use of pharmaceuticals in treating the various issues of ASPD. Nonetheless, psychiatric medications such as antipsychotics, antidepressants, and mood stabilizers can be used to control symptoms such as aggression and impulsivity, as well as treat disorders that may co-occur with ASPD for which medications are indicated.

== Prognosis ==
Boys are almost twice as likely to meet all of the diagnostic criteria for ASPD than girls and they will often start showing symptoms of the disorder much earlier in life. Children who do not show symptoms of the disorder through age 15 will almost never develop ASPD later in life. If adults exhibit milder symptoms of ASPD, it is likely that they never met the criteria for the disorder in their childhood and were consequently never diagnosed. Overall, symptoms of ASPD tend to peak in late teens and early twenties but can often reduce or improve through age 40.

Symptoms of antisocial personality disorder (ASPD) often peaks in early adulthood, with individuals in their twenties and thirties displaying increased impulsivity, aggression, and other antisocial behaviors. Research has identified several factors that may contribute to the onset and persistence of ASPD symptoms during this period, including poor family functioning, reduced empathic concern, and elevated motor impulsivity. For instance, a study of 443 emerging adults found that low parental behavioral control and high impulsivity were significant predictors of antisocial personality problems.

As individuals with ASPD age, behavioral symptoms frequently diminish—a phenomenon sometimes referred to as "antisocial burnout." This decline is especially evident in impulsive and aggressive behaviors. However, core traits such as manipulativeness and emotional detachment may persist into later life. While these residual traits may not result in overt criminal activity, they can continue to negatively affect interpersonal relationships and social functioning.

In older adulthood, the apparent decline in ASPD prevalence may be influenced by diagnostic limitations. Standard diagnostic criteria may fail to capture age-specific manifestations of the disorder, potentially leading to underdiagnosis or misclassification. Additionally, neurodegenerative conditions such as frontotemporal dementia can mimic or exacerbate antisocial behaviors in older individuals, complicating accurate assessment and treatment planning.

ASPD is ultimately a lifelong disorder that has chronic consequences, though some of these can be moderated over time. There may be a high variability of the long-term outlook of antisocial personality disorder. The treatment of this disorder can be successful, but it entails unique difficulties. It is unlikely to see rapid change especially when the condition is severe. In fact, past studies revealed that remission rates were small, with 27–31% of patients with ASPD seeing an improvement "with the most violent and dangerous features remitting". As a result of the characteristics of ASPD (e.g., displaying charm in effort of personal gain, manipulation), patients seeking treatment (mandated or otherwise) may appear to be "cured" in order to get out of treatment. According to definitions found in the DSM-5, people with ASPD can be deceitful and intimidating in their relationships. When they are caught doing something wrong, they often appear to be unaffected and unemotional about the consequences. Over time, continual behavior that lacks empathy and concern may lead to someone with ASPD taking advantage of the kindness of others, including their therapist.

Without proper treatment, individuals with ASPD could lead a life that brings about harm to themselves or others. This can be detrimental to their families and careers. Those with ASPD lack interpersonal skills (e.g., lack of remorse, lack of empathy, lack of emotional-processing skills). As a result of the inability to create and maintain healthy relationships due to the lack of interpersonal skills, individuals with ASPD may find themselves in predicaments such as divorce, unemployment, homelessness and even premature death by suicide. They also see higher rates of committed crime, reaching peaks in their late teens and often committing higher-severity crimes in their younger ages of diagnoses. Comorbidity of other mental illnesses such as depression or substance use disorder is prevalent among patients with ASPD. People with ASPD are also more likely to commit homicides and other crimes. Those who are imprisoned longer often see higher rates of improvement with symptoms of ASPD than others who have been imprisoned for a shorter amount of time.

According to one study, aggressive tendencies show in about 72% of all male patients diagnosed with ASPD. About 29% of the men studied with ASPD also showed a prevalence of premeditated aggression. Based on the evidence in the study, the researchers concluded that aggression in patients with ASPD is mostly impulsive, though there are some long-term evidences of pre-meditated aggressions. It often occurs that those with higher psychopathic traits will exhibit the pre-meditated aggressions to those around them. Over the course of a patient's life with ASPD, he or she can exhibit this aggressive behavior and harm those close to him or her.

Because a patient with severe ASPD may not quickly respond to the administered therapies, Harvard Medical School notes that time and resources may be better spent treating victims who have been affected by someone with severe ASPD, such as their family. In fact, a patient with ASPD may only accept treatment when ordered by a court, which will make their course of treatment difficult and severe. Because of the challenges in treatment, the patient's family and close friends must take an active role in decisions about therapies that are offered to the patient. Ultimately, there must be a group effort to address the long-term effects of the disorder.

== Epidemiology ==
The estimated lifetime prevalence of ASPD amongst the general population falls within 1% to 4%, skewed towards 6% men and 2% women. The prevalence of ASPD is even higher in selected populations, like prisons, where there is a preponderance of violent offenders. It has been found that the prevalence of ASPD among prisoners is just under 50%. According to one study (n=23000), the prevalence of ASPD in prisoners is 47% in men and 21% in women. Thus, with only 27–31% of patients with ASPD seeing an improvement in symptoms over time, statistically around one third (33%) of male prisoners will not see any improvement in their symptoms, and are thus essentially prognostically hopeless. The corresponding percentage of female prisoners with statistically no chance of improvement in symptoms is around 15% or roughly one in six. Similarly, the prevalence of ASPD is higher among patients in alcohol or other drug (AOD) use treatment programs than in the general population, suggesting a link between ASPD and AOD use and dependence. As part of the Epidemiological Catchment Area (ECA) study, men with ASPD were found to be three to five times more likely to excessively use alcohol and illicit substances than those men without ASPD. There was found to be increased severity of this substance use in women with ASPD. In a study conducted with both men and women with ASPD, women were more likely to misuse substances compared to their male counterparts.

Homelessness is also common amongst people with ASPD. A study on 31 youths of San Francisco and 56 youths in Chicago found that 84% and 48% of the homeless met the diagnostic criteria for ASPD respectively. Another study on the homeless found that 25% of participants had ASPD.

Individuals with ASPD are at an elevated risk for suicide. Some studies suggest this increase in suicidality is in part due to the association between suicide and symptoms or trends within ASPD, such as criminality and substance use. Children of people with ASPD are also at risk. Some research suggests that negative or traumatic experiences in childhood, perhaps as a result of the choices a parent with ASPD might make, can be a predictor of delinquency later on in the child's life. Additionally, with variability between situations, children of a parent with ASPD may face consequences of delinquency if they are raised in an environment in which crime and violence is common. Suicide is a leading cause of death among youth who display antisocial behavior, especially when mixed with delinquency. Incarceration, which could come as a consequence of actions from a person with ASPD, is a predictor for suicide ideation in youth.

=== Comorbidity ===
ASPD presents high comorbidity rates with various psychiatric conditions, particularly substance use and mood disorder. Individuals diagnosed with ASPD are significantly more prone to develop substance use disorder (SUDs), with studies showing that they are approximately 13 times more likely to be diagnosed with a SUD than those without ASPD. This population also faces increased risks for mood disorders, including a fourfold likelihood of experiencing major depressive disorder, as well as heightened risks for suicidal ideation and behaviors. Anxiety disorders, particularly post-traumatic stress disorder (PTSD) and social anxiety disorder, are also common comorbidities, affecting up to 50% of individuals with ASPD. These comorbidities often exacerbate the problems of those with ASPD, leading to more severe symptoms, complex treatment needs, and poorer clinical outcomes.

When combined with alcoholism, people may show frontal brain function deficits on neuropsychological tests greater than those associated with each condition. Alcohol use disorder is likely caused by lack of impulse and behavioral control exhibited by antisocial personality disorder patients.

== History ==
The first version of the DSM in 1952 listed sociopathic personality disturbance. This category was for individuals who were considered "...ill primarily in terms of society and of conformity with the prevailing milieu, and not only in terms of personal discomfort and relations with other individuals." There were four subtypes, referred to as "reactions": antisocial, dyssocial, sexual, and addiction. The antisocial reaction was said to include people who were "always in trouble" and not learning from it, maintaining "no loyalties", frequently callous and lacking responsibility, with an ability to "rationalize" their behavior. The category was described as more specific and limited than the existing concepts of "constitutional psychopathic state" or "psychopathic personality" which had a very broad meaning; the narrower definition was in line with criteria advanced by Hervey M. Cleckley from 1941, while the term sociopathic had been advanced by George Partridge in 1928 when studying the early environmental influence on psychopaths. Partridge discovered the correlation between antisocial psychopathic disorder and parental rejection experienced in early childhood.

The DSM-II in 1967 rearranged the categories and "antisocial personality" was now listed as one of ten personality disorders but still described similarly, to be applied to individuals who are: "basically unsocialized", in repeated conflicts with society, incapable of significant loyalty, selfish, irresponsible, unable to feel guilt or learn from prior experiences, and who tend to rationalize. The manual preface contains "special instructions" including "Antisocial personality should always be specified as mild, moderate, or severe." The DSM-II warned that a history of legal or social offenses was not by itself enough to justify the diagnosis, and that a "group delinquent reaction" of childhood or adolescence or "social maladjustment without manifest psychiatric disorder" should be ruled out first. The dyssocial personality type was relegated in the DSM-II to "dyssocial behavior" for individuals who are predatory and follow more or less criminal pursuits, such as racketeers, dishonest gamblers, prostitutes, and dope peddlers (DSM-I classified this condition as sociopathic personality disorder, dyssocial type). It would later resurface as the name of a diagnosis in the ICD manual produced by the WHO, later spelled dissocial personality disorder and considered approximately equivalent to the ASPD diagnosis.

The DSM-III in 1980 included the full term antisocial personality disorder and, as with other disorders, there was now a full checklist of symptoms focused on observable behaviors to enhance consistency in diagnosis between different psychiatrists ('inter-rater reliability'). The ASPD symptom list was based on the Research Diagnostic Criteria developed from the so-called Feighner Criteria from 1972, and in turn largely credited to influential research by sociologist Lee Robins published in 1966 as "Deviant Children Grown Up". However, Robins has previously clarified that while the new criteria of prior childhood conduct problems came from her work, she and co-researcher psychiatrist Patricia O'Neal got the diagnostic criteria they used from Lee's husband the psychiatrist Eli Robins, one of the authors of the Feighner criteria who had been using them as part of diagnostic interviews.

The DSM-IV maintained the trend for behavioral antisocial symptoms while noting, "This pattern has also been referred to as psychopathy, sociopathy, or dyssocial personality disorder" and re-including in the 'Associated Features' text summary some of the underlying personality traits from the older diagnoses. The DSM-5 has the same diagnosis of antisocial personality disorder. The Pocket Guide to the DSM-5 Diagnostic Exam suggests that a person with ASPD may present "with psychopathic features" if he or she exhibits "a lack of anxiety or fear and a bold, efficacious interpersonal style".

== Society and culture ==
The way antisocial personality disorder (ASPD) is understood and treated can vary across different cultures. In Western, individualistic societies like the United States and much of Europe, ASPD is usually seen as a problem with personal behavior. It's often linked to criminal actions and people who break social rules. The DSM-5, used for diagnosing mental disorders in the U.S., defines ASPD using traits like lying, impulsiveness, and not caring about other people's rights. Because of this, ASPD is often diagnosed in people who have had problems with the law.

In contrast, collectivist cultures such as those in China, Japan, and South Korea tend to focus more on group harmony, family relationships, and social roles. In these cultures, behaviors related to ASPD might not be diagnosed in the same way. Some traits may be viewed as damaging to family or community bonds rather than just being individual problems. Studies suggest that in some Eastern cultures, doctors may diagnose these behaviors differently or less often, especially because of stigma or differences in how mental illness is seen.

Treatment also reflects these cultural differences. In the West, therapy like cognitive behavioral therapy and legal supervision are commonly used, whereas in collectivist cultures, treatment may include more family involvement or community-based efforts to help the person fit back into society.

=== Incarceration and prevalence in prisons ===
Antisocial personality disorder (ASPD) in prison populations has been examined in epidemiological research from Ethiopia. A study of incarcerated men found that approximately 31% met criteria for ASPD, a prevalence far higher than that estimated in the general population. The disorder was strongly associated with substance use disorders, particularly alcohol and khat, as well as with other psychosocial vulnerabilities.

From a biosocial perspective, research such as Moffitt's life-course-persistent framework shows how genetic predispositions interact with childhood adversity to produce long-term antisocial trajectories. This aligns with findings that ASPD among prisoners reflects not only clinical diagnosis but also developmental pathways shaped by poverty, maltreatment, and institutional factors. Drawing on the concept of the "mindful body," ASPD in prisons can be seen as existing simultaneously on several levels: as an individual psychiatric condition, as a reflection of broader social norms about deviance, and as shaped by institutional and political systems such as incarceration.

== See also ==
- Gaslighting
- Anti-social behaviour order
