= William K. Summers =

American neuroscientist

William Koopmans Summers (born April 14, 1944) is an independent neuroscientist and was the inventor of Tacrine (Cognex) as a treatment for Alzheimer's disease {US Patent No. 4,816,456}. Tacrine was the first FDA approved anti-dementia drug. Today there are five FDA approved anti-dementia drugs.

== Early life ==
Summers was born in Jefferson City, Missouri. He graduated from Jefferson City Public High School in 1962. He began college at Westminster College in Fulton, Missouri in 1962 and transferred to the University of Missouri where he received a Bachelor of Science in 1966. Summers attended Washington University School of Medicine, graduating in 1971 after an elective year of basic research in nephrology. This effort led to his first academic publication and a continued interest in medical research.

== Education ==
Summers’ post graduate education was at Washington University School of Medicine. He did a combined residency in internal medicine and psychiatry. Summers was in the last group of ‘ward internal medicine internships’ at Barnes Hospital under Carl V. Moore. In psychiatry he was influenced by pioneers in biological psychiatry such as Eli Robins, George Winokur, George Murphy, John Feigner, John William Olney, Paula J. Clayton, Robert Woodruff, Ferris N. Pitts, and many other founders of the medical basis of psychiatry.

== Career ==
Summers served as an Assistant Professor of Internal Medicine and Psychiatry at the University of Pittsburgh and later at the Los Angeles County+USC Medical Center. During this time Summers did a pilot intravenous, trial of tacrine in Alzheimer's disease and found measurable acute improvement in the memory performance of the subjects.

In 1981, Summers began private medical practice in Arcadia, California. He soon joined the clinical faculty of UCLA where he began working further on the development of tacrine as a practical treatment of Alzheimer's disease. He discovered that tacrine was readily absorbed by oral administration and did enter the central nervous system, An intravenous treatment for a chronic disease is not a practical treatment. An oral preparation of tacrine was a potentially practical treatment for Alzheimer's. Safety experiments were done in animal models. In 1984, it was inconceivable that a dementia patient could improve on a short or long term basis. Thus, psychometric scales had to be developed and validated.

The oral tacrine study was published in the New England Journal of Medicine on November 13, 1986. The accompanying editorial was very positive, but the scientific community of the time was not prepared to accept that Alzheimer's could be treated. Criticism by researchers associated with the Alzheimer's Association was sharp.

The US Food and Drug Administration investigated Dr. Summers from November 18, 1986 through May 4, 1989. Additionally, Dr. Summer's work was investigated by UCLA. Considerable publicity occurred. Summers was defended by Robert L. Bartley and Daniel Henninger by a series of Wall Street Journal editorials.

On March 28, 1989 U.S. Patent 4,816,456 was issued to Dr. Summers. With no findings to support allegations and concerns, Frances Oldham Kelsey closed the FDA Office of Compliance investigation, in May, 1989. Nevertheless, the Office for Drug Evaluation I, placed Summers on a secret "black list" without informing him. Once discovered by Summers, in 2007, the citation was removed.

== Impact and achievements ==
When Summers initiated his research, it was commonly accepted that Alzheimer's disease was a progressive unremitting neurodegenerative disease that could not be improved. Today, there are five FDA approved medications for the treatment of Alzheimer's or Dementia of other types. In 2011, there are 842 Clinical trials on over 100 drugs under investigation for the treatment of Alzheimer's disease. Since the 1980s, the majority of research effort was focused on the genetics and toxicity of beta amyloid protein as the cause of Alzheimer's disease. Summers developed alternative hypothesis based on oxidative brain injury. He hypothesized that brain insults (head trauma, viral infection, open heart surgery, hypertension, diabetes, and others) create a smoldering inflammation which produces free radicals and distant sites of inflammation. These areas of inflammation cause the production and deposition of beta amyloid and tau protein. Based on this theory, Summers created a complex, potent antioxidant which is classified as a health supplement. This antioxidant combination has been shown to improve memory in normal aging people.
