= William Summers (disambiguation) =

William Summers (1853–1893) was a British politician and barrister.

William Summers may also refer to:

- William H. Summers (1930-2002), British Crown jeweller
- William K. Summers (born 1944), American neuroscientist
- William L. Summers (born 1942), American defense lawyer
- Willie Summers (1893–?), Scottish footballer

== See also ==
- Bill Summers (disambiguation)
- William Sommers (disambiguation)
