= Karl Birnbaum =

German-American psychiatrist

Karl Birnbaum (August 20, 1878 in Schweidnitz/Świdnica – March 31, 1950 in Philadelphia) was a German-American psychiatrist and neurologist.

== Career ==
In 1902 he received his doctorate from the University of Freiburg, and subsequently working at the Herzberge asylum in Berlin-Lichtenberg. In 1923 he began work as an assistant to Karl Bonhoeffer (1868-1948) at the Charité-Berlin. In 1927 he became an associate professor.

An early interest in criminal psychology reportedly developed while in charge of high-secure wards for criminal and dangerous patients between 1908 and 1919.

In 1930 he was appointed medical director of the Heil- und Pflegeanstalt in Berlin, but because of his Jewish heritage was dismissed from his position after the Nazi takeover of Germany. In 1939 he emigrated to the United States, where he worked as a lecturer at the New School for Social Research in New York City. From 1940 he also worked at the municipal medical department of Philadelphia.

Birnbaum's primary research was in the fields of clinical psychiatry, criminal psychology (forensic psychiatry, psychopathy and psychopathology).

== Theories ==
=== Psychopathy ===
Birnbaum was an influential writer on psychopathy, then having a very broad usage perhaps more equivalent to the category of personality disorders today, especially in regard to criminology.

Million, Simonsen and Birket-Smith have stated that "K. Birnbaum (1909), writing in Germany at the time of Kraepelin's later editions, was the first to suggest that the term "sociopathic" might be the most apt designation for the majority of these cases."

The term sociopathy would later gradually become popular in America, especially as expounded by psychologist George E. Partridge (1930) and adopted into early versions of the Diagnostic and Statistical Manual of Mental Disorders and is still referred to as an alternative term for antisocial personality disorder. Birnbaum proposed several subtypes of sociopathy and argued that while there may be varying degrees of 'constitutional' disposition towards disorders that could lead to maladjustment and crime, it was the effect of social forces and environments which shaped the eventual outcome.

Birnbaum published in 1914 a large encyclopedic volume on criminal psychopaths, a second and revised edition of which would be released in 1926. Reviewers at the time noted different themes—a view of constitutional psychopathy as a form of degeneration with both inherited (genetic 'taint') and prenatally acquired (through injury to 'germ plasm') types, resulting in a disposition towards mental disorder or a reduced capacity to resist anti-social tendencies; rejection of the term 'inferiors' for this category; a view that emotion is central to the disorder rather than necessarily deficient intellect; description of nearly 20 subtypes of psychopathic personalities (more akin to personality disorders than psychopathy as often defined today); a pivotal role for life events and social conditions in shaping whether someone with various psychopathic dispositions would end up engaging in antisocial or criminal behavior or not, and an insistence that even lifelong criminality does not necessarily mean underlying psychopathy.

Birnbaum suggested that some forms of psychopathy involving moral or emotional immaturity or instability could be overcome by social-educative methods or spiritual leadership.

In 1930 in an article 'The Social Significance of the Psychopathic', Birnbaum defined psychopaths as anyone who shows 'in a moderate degree dispositionally conditioned, 'constitutional', psychic deviations, and especially...in the sphere of character'. He stated this sufficiently distinguished psychopaths from the 'really insane', though not necessarily from the 'normal'.

By 1949, now in America, Birnbaum writes in regard to pathological juvenile delinquency about the importance of considering both an immaturity of the personality from within, and environmental influences from without, and the complex interactions and pathways to conditions that result.

=== Pathogenesis and Pathoplasticity ===
Birnbaum in 1923 also coined a distinction between pathogenic and pathoplastic factors, in his work "Der Aufbau der Psychose. Grundzüge der psychiatrischen Strukturanalyse". The term pathogenic was used to refer to what causes the essential structure of a pathology, and pathoplastic to what causes the variation in the disorder between individuals or cultures. The terms are still sometimes used today in explanations for psychiatric conditions, though the concept of plasticity also has separate widespread uses as in neuroplasticity or Activity-dependent plasticity, and phenotypic plasticity). It has recently been pointed out that the distinction has generally been used to report Culture-bound syndromes in non-Western countries, despite western culture also causing its own unique forms of disorders. Moreover, cultural factors could be pathogenic as well as pathoplastic, for example by influencing epigenetic and associated neuronal processes.

== See also ==
- Ernst Kretschmer
- Kurt Schneider

== Literary works ==
- (1902) Versuch eines Schemas für Intelligenzhandlungen. Freiburg i.B.: Epstein (Med. Diss. v. 1902).
- (1902) Versuch eines Schemas für Intelligenzhandlungen. Pädagogisch-psychologische Studien, 3: 57-62.
- (1908) Psychosen mit Wahnbildung und wahnhafte Einbildungen bei Degenerativen. Halle a.S.: Marhold.
- (1909) Über psychopathische Persönlichkeiten. Eine psychopathologische Studie. Wiesbaden: Bergmann.
- (1911) Die krankhafte Willenschwäche und ihre Erscheinungsformen. Eine psychopathologische Studie für Ärzte, Pädagogen und gebildete Laien. Wiesbaden: Bergmann.
- (1914) Die psychopathischen Verbrecher. Die Grenzzustände zwischen geistiger Gesundheit und Krankheit in ihren Beziehungen zu Verbrechen und Strafwesen. Leipzig: Thieme.
- (1918) Psychische Verursachung seelischer Störungen und die psychisch bedingten abnormen Seelenvorgänge. Wiesbaden: Bergmann.
- (1919) Der Aufbau der Psychose. Allgemeine Zeitschrift für Psychiatrie, 75: 455-502.
- (1920) Psychopathologische Dokumente. Selbstbekenntnisse und Fremdzeugnisse aus dem seelischen Grenzlande. Berlin: Springer.
- (1920) Die Strukturanalyse als klinisches Forschungsprinzip. Zeitschrift für die gesamte Neurologie und Psychiatrie, 53: 121-129.
- (1921) Kriminalpsychopathologie. Systematische Darstellung. Berlin: Springer.
- (1923) Der Aufbau der Psychose. Grundzüge der psychiatrischen Strukturanalyse. Berlin: Springer.
- (1924) Grundzüge der Kulturpsychopathologie. München: Bergmann.
- (1927) Die psychischen Heilmethoden. Für ärztliches Studium und Praxis. Leipzig: Thieme.
- (1928) Geschichte der psychiatrischen Wissenschaft. In O. Bumke (Hrsg.), Handbuch der Geisteskrankheiten (Erster Band, Erster Teil). Berlin: Springer, 11-49.
- (1930) Birnbaum, Karl (1930). "The Social Significance of the Psychopathic". Annals of the American Academy of Political and Social Science. 149 (3): 70–79. doi:10.1177/000271623014900306. JSTOR 1017390. S2CID 145505804.
- (1930) (Hrsg.) Handwörterbuch der medizinischen Psychologie. Leipzig: Thieme.
- (1931) Kriminalpsychopathologie und psychobiologische Verbrecherkunde. Berlin: Springer.
- (1933) Soziologie der Neurosen. Berlin: Springer.
- (1935) Die Welt des Geisteskranken. Berlin: Springer.
