= Paula Clayton =

Clinical psychiatrist (1934–2021)

Paula Jean Clayton (December 1, 1934 – September 4, 2021) was an American psychiatrist. She was the first female chairperson of a major psychiatric department in the United States. She is known for destigmatising mental illness, rigorous data driven research methods to study psychiatry, especially depression and bipolar disorder.

== Early life and education ==
Paula Jean Limberg was born on December 1, 1934, in St. Louis, Missouri. She was one of three daughters born to Oscar Limberg and his wife, Dorothea Pflasterer. Her father worked for a clothing company, and her mother was a suffragist.

She married Charles Clayton, and enrolled at the University of Michigan as a pre-medicine student, and graduated in 1956. She returned to her hometown to attend the Washington University's School of Medicine (WashU Medicine). Clayton was one of four women to graduate from WashU Medicine in 1960. She had a child during her fourth year of medical school which influenced her to choose a residency in psychiatry instead of internal medicine.

== Career ==
Clayton worked as an intern at St. Luke's Hospital and subsequently specialized in psychiatry during her residency at Barnes and Renard Hospitals. From 1964 to 1965, Clayton was chief resident. Upon completing her residency, Clayton joined the WashU Medicine faculty. At WashU Medicine, Clayton worked closely with Eli Robins, George Winokur, Samuel Guze, and Ted Reich to develop what became known as the Feighner Criteria, a psychiatric diagnostic criteria based on the medical model, moving psychiatry away from introspection and psychoanalysis. She was promoted to full professor in 1976.

In 1980, four years later, Clayton became the first woman in the United States to chair a department of psychiatry, when she left for the University of Minnesota Medical School. In 1999, Clayton stepped down from Minnesota. Between 2001 and 2005, Clayton was a part-time professor of psychiatry at the University of New Mexico School of Medicine. From 2006 to 2014, she was based in New York City, and served the American Foundation for Suicide Prevention as its medical director. The Journal of Affective Disorders published a festschrift to commemorate Clayton's career in 2006.

== Personal life ==
Paula Clayton had a daughter and two sons with Charles Clayton, whom she later divorced. In 2015, Clayton retired and moved to Pasadena, California, where she died on September 4, 2021, of a viral infection.

== Legacy ==
Paula Clayton worked to destigmatise mental illness and "was the first person to demonstrate, through research, that bereavement, while phenotypically mirroring the symptoms of depressive illness, is a distinct, non-clinical entity". As a female chair of the University of Minnesota's Department of Psychiatry in 1980, Clayton brought equality to the department, including equal pay, raising female faculty members’ salaries to match their male counterparts.
