= Bobby E. Wright =

African-American clinical psychologist, scholar, educator and political activist

- Born: Bobby Eugene Wright; March 1, 1934; Hobson City, Alabama, United States
- Died: April 6, 1982 (aged 48); Chicago, Illinois, United States
- Education: Chicago State University; University of Chicago
- Occupation: Psychologist

Bobby Eugene Wright (March 1, 1934, Hobson City, Alabama – April 6, 1982, Chicago) was an American clinical psychologist, scholar, educator, political activist and humanitarian. His parents were Benjamin and Myrtle Wright.

He received his BSc in Education and MSc in Counseling from Chicago State University and his PhD in clinical psychology from the University of Chicago in 1972. At the time of his death, he was president-elect of the Association of Black Psychologists.

During the mid 1960s he worked as a truant officer in the Chicago Public School system, and led a successful challenge to racist hiring procedures for black teachers. His political work has been credited with helping lay foundations that later enabled the election of Chicago's first African-American mayor, Harold Washington in 1983.

Two of his scholarly works have been described as highly influential by the 2013 National Conference on African/Black Psychology: The Psychopathic Racial Personality (1974, republished in 1984 and other years as one in a series of essays), and Mentacide: The Ultimate Threat to Black Survival (1979).

His work emphasized the need to recognize psychological racial warfare, and for Africans to define themselves in their terms, while analyzing the psychology of White supremacy not only of its victims, and to develop a durable social theory and associated institutions to change the politics of mental health.

== The Wright Social-Political Model ==
The social political model was an influence from Africans or Blacks in the United States that took their own lives in 1980 due to depression. Bobby Wright's argument of the social - political model was that all persons of African descent living under Caucasian domination that took their own lives were victims of White Supremacy. He saw Black suicide as a political dynamic and also of self-destruction. Due to the psychological adaptation, he believed that the depression because of White dominance was the main reason why Africans in the United States took their own lives. The social-political theory is now used to influence the interpersonal-psychological theory of suicide behavior, although Wright's perspective was more of a Western perspective. Despite Bobby Wright's limited amount of writing on the social political model, his theory is used to test emotional disturbances, research physical and mental health workers of Africans living in the United States. The social- political model was used with multi level social integration model which include the implications that police killings and state cover ups were connected with clients own life taking behavior. The social-political model is now used to seek suicide prevention and interventions.

== Achievements ==
He has been classed in the 'radical school' of Black psychology of the time - those who developed a self-consciously independent framework in opposition to the dominant worldview stemming from europeans, many of whom were influenced by Frantz Fanon; by contrast with traditionalists who worked with the American Psychological Society of the time and critiqued but did not correct, or reformists who were partially independent and appealed for change to both white and black cultures.

He also wrote The Black Child: A Destiny in Jeopardy.

He contributed to political processes concerning the continent of Africa and Pan-Africanism.

The Bobby E. Wright Comprehensive Mental Health Centre in Chicago was so renamed in his honor.

== Atheism ==
Wright was staunch atheist, and publicly and unhesitatingly attacked theism and religious belief. He wrote the following in the fall issue of Black Books Bulletin in 1974:

"Because of their lack of ethical or moral development, there is no conflict between the white's religion and racial oppression. The white race had historically oppressed, exploited, and killed black [sic] people, all in the name of their god Jesus Christ and with the sanction of their churches. For example, it is generally overlooked that the Ku Klux Klan is primarily a religious organization. Also, blacks [sic] should never forget the Pope [Pius XI] blessing the Italian planes and pilots on their way to bombing Ethiopian men, women, and children who only had spears to defend themselves."

Speaking at the Annual Afrikan American Institute in 1981, in response to a question about black organization, he stated:

"This shows you the nature of the beast, this shows you about Mentacide. This subject should be talked about in the churches. Guess what you talk about when you go to church? Everything but what to do, you talk about some God that nobody ever did find. Let me tell you something about God. . . . If there is a God I can say this: 1) He or She is mad at us, 2) He or She is not on our side, 3) He or She is indifferent, or 4) He or She is White."

Pressed by further questioning to defend his position, he elaborated on Einstein's remarks about achieving immortality by reaching the speed of light and thus stopping time:

"He [Einstein] said, 'The problem with this thought [immortality] is that people cannot conceptualize time stopping.' In this same way, certain people cannot conceptualize a world without God, and a lot of other things I can talk about they cannot even conceptualize. You still can't go beyond your imagination. It just violates everything you believe and have been trained to believe... But most certainly I will tell you this, nothing that operates in this world today can I attribute to God, can I attribute to a Supreme Being. Nothing."
