= George E. Partridge =

American psychologist

- c. 1918
- Born: George Everett Partridge; May 31, 1870; Worcester, Massachusetts, US
- Died: November 16, 1953 (aged 83); Baltimore, Maryland, US
- Burial place: Hope Cemetery
- Education: Clark University
- Occupation: Psychologist

George Everett Partridge (May 31, 1870 – November 16, 1953) was an American psychologist credited with popularizing the term sociopath in 1930 that Karl Brinbaum had suggested in 1909. He worked with the influential G. Stanley Hall at Clark University. One year after his death, the George Everett Partridge Memorial Foundation was incorporated in 1954 by the Partridge family to memorialize his life's work in the study and treatment of mental and personality disorders. The Foundation focused on developing programs to promote treatment centers for mentally disabled children, often referred to as the "forgotten children." Partridge schools were established. The first of which was in Herndon, Virginia, for older boys with moderate intellectual disability resulting from brain damage. However, the foundation was forfeited in 1991.

== Early life and work ==
At Harvard, c. 1893

George E. Partridge was born in Worcester, Massachusetts on May 31, 1870. He attended Harvard College for one year before transferring to Clark University.

His PhD and early work focused on the psychology of using alcohol and other intoxicants. He surveyed historical patterns of use, including in religious and social contexts. He gave varying details across cultures stating alcohol consumption to be "polygenetic" and considered why there may be a human "intoxication impulse". He related that varying religious groups such as the Hindus, Greeks, Pueblos, Dahomans, Ainos, and several others are displayed similar intoxication rituals to appease deities. He conducted his own research experiments on the effects of alcohol, in which he found opposite effects to those reported by the influential German psychiatrist Emil Kraepelin. Partridge's interest stemmed from a "desire to test the value of psychological methods in dealing with certain ethical problems. Any one of a large number of impulses which are important because they determine morbid conduct might have been chosen for similar study, as for example, the gambling impulse, envy and jealousy, or the sexual impulse."

He published a short book in 1910 concerning the philosophical and scientific issue of individuality, and how teachers can learn each child's unique character, temperament and potential. He also helped publish Hall's writings on education.

He began writing a book during the final months of World War I, published in 1919, in which he had analyzed motives for war "in the light of the general principles of the development of society", and addressed the likely effects of the war on countries and the "world-consciousness".

== Psychopathy studies ==
Starting in 1928 he published a series of studies conducted at The Sheppard and Enoch Pratt Hospital in Baltimore on the 'psychopathic personality' — a broad category used somewhat differently from some predominant definitions today. He postulated three subtypes: delinquent (commonly in males), inadequate (commonly in females), and the generally incompatible or emotionally unstable. He speculated that the first two were likely more biologically determined while the latter appeared to be more linked to early upbringing. He then published a brief paper in 1929 outlining the negative social effects of the "legion of deviates" vaguely classed as having psychopathic personalities, while noting the difficulty in discerning the interaction between cultural patterns and personality patterns, and suggesting that groups as a whole could also become pathological, perhaps most strikingly so in national motivations for war. He concluded: "The thesis here is that the thorough and adequate investigation of the individual consciousness in its pathological manifestations yields us precisely the background needed for the study of the group consciousness – that is, for the development of a scientific socio-pathology."

== Sociopathy concept ==
In a 1930 review from the Research Service of the Sheppard and Enoch Pratt Hospital, Partridge identifies confusion in the definition and application of the diagnosis of psychopathy, as at the time the term could cover almost any kind of personality deviation acutely or chronically, or only certain more specific conditions, or act virtually as a holder for any otherwise unclassified mental disorder. He also argues that the practice, then common, of calling psychopathy "constitutional" was speculative (in fact very little being known about its causes); and that bisecting personality into the "normal" and "abnormal" is simplistic for something complex, finely nuanced, and individual.

However, he concludes that a consistent factor linking most cases is persistent social maladjustment with a motivation towards behavior with adverse effects on others, and he suggests that "sociopathy" would therefore be a more accurate and appropriate term. Partridge suggests that the term "psychopathy" no longer be used at all, having no usefulness in application to the antisocial group more accurately described as "sociopathic," nor much use for the various remaining conditions not inherently chronically antisocial, and certainly not to cover both groups at once.

The Oxford English Dictionary (2011) definition of "sociopath" quotes from his 1930 article: "We may use the term 'sociopathy' to mean anything deviated or pathological in social relations" and "We may exclude from the class of essential sociopaths those whose inadequacy is primarily related to physical weakness, fear, hypersensitiveness, shyness and self-blame."

In fact, however, the first part of the quotation in full is: "If we may use the term 'sociopathy' to mean anything deviated or pathological in social relations, whether of individuals with one another, or within or towards groups, and also in the relations of groups to one another, we have a fairly communicable meaning, and a term which may apply descriptively to a great number of persons." The phrase "essential sociopath" was Partridge's attempt to describe the type with the most deep-rooted chronic antisocial motivations.

The American Psychiatric Association created a diagnosis of "Sociopathic Personality Disturbance" in the first edition of its Diagnostic and Statistical Manual of Mental Disorders in 1952, which included four subtypes dubbed "reactions": antisocial, dyssocial, sexual, and addiction. The "antisocial" description was shaped by criteria advanced by psychiatrist Hervey Cleckley, who used the term "psychopath". The DSM-II in 1968 moved the diagnosis of antisocial personality into a new section on personality disorders, below which dyssocial behavior was also listed.

In 1976 psychiatrist Richard L. Jenkins (who wrote the child and adolescent behavioral disorders section of the DSM-II) pointed out that although "sociopathy" had become widely used as a diagnosis, it was not a diagnostic term per se in the DSM-I or II. In 1980 the full term Antisocial Personality Disorder was listed, with some of Cleckley's traits removed and new behavioral criteria in their place. Nevertheless, the term "psychopath" gradually came into wider clinical use, partly through the influence of Canadian psychologist Robert D. Hare's Psychopathy Checklist, which revived and modified Cleckley's criteria in a criminological context. Both the DSM-IV and DSM-5 noted: "The essential feature of antisocial personality disorder is a pervasive pattern of disregard for, and violation of, the rights of others that begins in childhood or early adolescence and continues into adulthood. This pattern has also been referred to as psychopathy, sociopathy, or dyssocial personality disorder."

== Personal life ==
Partridge married Emelyn Smythe Newcomb in New York City on August 31, 1898, and they had three children.

He died at Johns Hopkins Hospital in Baltimore on November 16, 1953, and was buried at Hope Cemetery in Worcester.

== Select bibliography ==
- An Outline of Individual Study. New York: Sturgis & Walton, 1910.
- The Nervous Life. New York: Sturgis & Walton, 1911.
- Studies in the Psychology of Intemperance. New York: Sturgis & Walton, 1912.
- A Reading Book in Modern Philosophy. New York: Sturgis & Walton, 1913.
- The Psychology of Nations: A Contribution to the Philosophy of History. New York: Macmillan, 1919.
- Story-Telling in School and Home: A Study in Educational Aesthetics, Revised Edition. New York: Macmillan, 1920 (with Emelyn Newcomb Partridge).
- Genetic Philosophy of Education. New York: Macmillan, 1925.

== See also ==
- History of psychopathy
