= Bill Summers =

Bill Summers may refer to:

- Bill Summers (car builder) (1935–2011), American car builder and longtime speed record holder
- Bill Summers (musician) (born 1948), American jazz percussionist
- Bill Summers (umpire) (1895–1966), American umpire
- Billy Summers, a 2021 novel by Stephen King

== See also ==
- William Summers (disambiguation)
