= George Winokur =

American physician (1925–1996)

- Born: February 10, 1925; Philadelphia, Pennsylvania
- Died: October 12, 1996 (aged 71); Iowa City, Iowa
- Education: University of Maryland School of Medicine
- Awards: Joseph Zubin Award (1992); ISPG Lifetime Achievement Award (1993)
- Scientific career
- Fields: Psychiatry
- Workplaces: Washington University in St. Louis; University of Iowa

George Winokur (February 10, 1925 - October 12, 1996) was an American psychiatrist known for seminal contributions to diagnostic criteria and to the classification and genetics of mood disorder.

== Education ==
He obtained his M.D. degree from the University of Maryland School of Medicine in 1947. He moved to the Washington University School of Medicine in 1954, becoming professor in 1966. In 1971 he moved to head the Department of Psychiatry at the University of Iowa College of Medicine until 1990, remaining as emeritus professor until his death in 1996.

== Contributions to psychiatry ==
He is known for having played a key role in the development from the 1950s of diagnostic criteria for mental disorders, particularly as a trio alongside Eli Robins and Samuel Guze. The proposals were influentially published as the so-called Feighner Criteria in 1972, which became the most cited article in psychiatry and shaped the Research Diagnostic Criteria and DSM-III of the American Psychiatric Association.

Winokur is also known for seminal contributions to the genetics of affective (mood) disorders, such as the inheritance of bipolar disorder. He made seminal contributions, often along with Paula Clayton, to establishing a distinction between unipolar and bipolar depression, and was one of the first in America to prescribe lithium for mania. He directed the "Iowa 500 studies" on the course of depression, mania and schizophrenia. He published extensively, over 400 articles and book chapters plus 20 textbooks and monographs.

What is less known is that Winokur came to have significant doubts about the development of the diagnostic criteria. While he considered them an improvement, he wrote that it was a fiction that the data could speak for themselves, and that it was impossible to eliminate clinical judgment in diagnosis, or carelessness or inconsistencies in how criteria are applied. In 1988 an article co-authored by Winokur stated: "Making up new sets of diagnostic criteria in American psychiatry has become a cottage industry with little attempt at quality control".
