= Lee Robins =

American professor

Lee Nelkin Robins
- Born: 29 August 1922; New Orleans, Louisiana
- Died: 25 September 2009 (aged 87); St. Louis, Missouri
- Citizenship: American
- Education: Radcliffe College; Harvard University
- Known for: Psychiatric Epidemiology
- Scientific career
- Fields: Social Science in Psychiatry, Psychiatric Epidemiology
- Workplaces: Washington University in St. Louis

Lee Nelken Robins (August 29, 1922 – September 25, 2009) was an American professor of social science in psychiatry and a leader in psychiatric epidemiology research. She was affiliated with the Washington University in St. Louis for more than 50 years from 1954 until 2007.

== Early years ==
Robins was born in New Orleans, Louisiana. In 1942 and 1943, she received bachelor's and master's degrees from Radcliffe College, and in 1951 she received a doctoral degree in sociology from Harvard University. After completing her doctoral program, Robins worked as a research assistant in the Department of Psychiatry at Massachusetts General Hospital.

== Academic career and research ==
In 1954, Robins became a member of the faculty at Washington University School of Medicine as a research assistant. She continued to work at Washington University for the next 50 years, being promoted to assistant professor in 1959, associate professor in 1962 and full professor (in sociology in psychiatry) in 1966. She founded and served as the director of the school's Master's Program in Psychiatric Epidemiology.

During her career at Washington University, Robins was recognized as a leader in research into psychiatric epidemiology, the study of the root causes of mental disorders in a population-wide sense. She was also "a leader in the development of diagnostic criteria for psychiatric diagnosis." The Los Angeles Times reported that Robins "pioneered the field of psychiatric epidemiology" and "played a key role in determining the prevalence of mental problems in the United States and the world."

Robins' research in the 1960s showed that abnormal behavior in childhood was an important predictor of psychiatric problems in adulthood. As an indicator of adult problems including alcoholism, divorce and incarceration, childhood antisocial behavior was found in the data to be a more accurate indicator than factors such as social class, family background, and childhood fears. Her research in the field led to new thinking in the mental health field on issues including teen suicide and drug abuse.

Her major study on the subject was published in 1966 under the title, "Deviant Children Grown Up: A Sociological and Psychiatric Study of Sociopathic Personality." This work would shape the later diagnosis of Antisocial Personality Disorder, and Robins would sit on the American Psychiatric Association's DSM committee which decided upon it.

Robins also conducted studies on psychiatric epidemiology among Vietnam veterans, disaster survivors and other groups. In the 1970s, the federal government funded her research into Vietnam veterans who were addicted to heroin or opium. Her research showed that many drug-addicted veterans recovered spontaneously when they returned to the United States—a finding that challenged the idea that such addiction was irreversible.

Kathleen Bucholz, a professor of psychiatry at Washington University, stated that Robins' "particular genius" was in "developing carefully honed questions for surveys that gathered information about the origins and incidence of mental illness." She wrote the diagnostic interview schedule and was one of the principal investigators for the Epidemiologic Catchment Area study that involved interviews of more than 20,000 Americans to determine the prevalence of psychiatric illness in the general population. Robins later prepared a multicultural version of her diagnostic interview schedule for international use by the World Health Organization.

Robins published more than 250 papers on topics including suicide, substance abuse among adolescents and Vietnam War veterans, alcoholism, and antisocial disorders and behavior in children.

In 2001, Robins retired as an active professor, but continued as a professor emerita and researcher at Washington University until 2007.

== Honors and awards ==
Robins received numerous honors and awards in her career, including being named as a fellow of the American Academy of Arts and Sciences and the Society for the Study of Addiction to Alcohol and Other Drugs. She was also a recipient of the Paul Hoch Award from the American Psychopathological Association, the Nathan B. Eddy Award from the College on Problems of Drug Dependence and the Lifetime Achievement Award from the Alcohol, Tobacco and Other Drugs section of the American Public Health Association. She was also named an honorary fellow of the Royal Society of Psychiatrists and of the American Society of Psychiatrists.

Robins also served on the editorial boards of numerous journals, including Criminal Behaviour and Mental Health, Epidemiologia e Psichiatria Sociale, International Journal of Methods in Psychiatric Research, Development and Psychopathology, Journal of Child Psychology and Psychiatry, Psychological Medicine, and Social and Community Psychiatry.

== Personal life ==
Robins was married to Eli Robins, an influential biological psychiatrist (e.g. Feighner Criteria and DSM-III), and they had four sons. Her husband died in 1994. In 1998, she married Hugh Chaplin Jr., an emeritus professor in the Washington University School of Medicine Departments of Medicine and Pathology.

In September 2009, she died of cancer at her home in St. Louis.

== Selected list of publications ==
- "The epidemiology of aggression," in E. Hollander and D.J. Stein, Impulsivity and Aggression, John Wiley and Sons, 1995.
- "Childhood conduct problems, adult psychopathology, and crime," in S. Hodgins, Mental Disorder and Crime, Sage, 1993.
- "Antisocial Personality" (with J. Tipp and T. Przybeck), in L.N. Robins & D. Regier, Psychiatric Disorders in America, The Free Press, 1991.
- "Intentional and Unintentional Injury in Black Americans", (with Carlson V, Bucholz K, Sussman L.), Report to Panel on Health Status and Demography of Black Americans, NRC Committee on the Status of Black Americans, 1988.
- "Family factors in the development of violent behavior", in D. Clark, Children and Violence, February 18–21, 1994: Congressional Program, The Aspen Institute, 1994.
- "Risk factors in the continuation of childhood antisocial behaviors into adulthood," (with K.S. Ratcliff), International Journal of Mental Health, Vol. 9, 1979.
- "Arrests and delinquency in two generations: a study of black urban families and their children," (with P.A. West & B. Herjanic), Journal of Child Psychology and Psychiatry, Vol. 16, 1975.
- "The role of prevention experiments in discovering the causes of children's antisocial behavior", in J. McCord, RE Tremblay, Preventing Antisocial Behavior, Guilford Press, 1992.
- "Early family predictors of child and adolescent antisocial behavior: Who are the mothers of delinquents?" (with B. Henry, T. Moffitt, F. Earls & P. Silva), Criminal Behaviour and Mental Health, Vol. 3, 1993.
- "Sociocultural trends affecting the prevalence of adolescent problems", in M. Rutter, Psychosocial Disturbances in Young People: Challenges for Prevention, Cambridge University Press, 1995, pp. 369–384.
