= Hans-Ulrich Wittchen =

Hans-Ulrich Wittchen (born 6 July 1951 in Bad Salzuflen) is a clinical psychologist, psychotherapist and epidemiologist. He has been a head of the Institute of Clinical Psychology and Psychotherapy and the Center of Clinical Epidemiology and Longitudinal Studies (CELOS) at TU Dresden. Since 2018, he is leading the research group "Clinical Psychology and Psychotherapy Research" at the Psychiatric Clinic of LMU Munich and directs the IAP-TU Dresden GmbH in Dresden.

== Biography and education ==
After graduating at the Freiherr-von-Stein-Gymnasium in Leverkusen in 1968, Wittchen studied Medicine and Psychology in Vienna, Austria. He began his career as a research assistant in the Department of Psychiatry in the Psychiatric University Hospital in Vienna (1973–1976). In Vienna, Hans-Ulrich Wittchen was in charge of introduction of behavioral therapy methods at Anton Proksch Institute and Ludwig-Boltzmann Institute. He earned his PhD in 1975 with a thesis on clinical significance of biofeedback methods in the faculty of psychology, Vienna University. In addition he completed his psychotherapy training licensed by the German Behavioral Therapists Association and the Österreichische Gesellschaft zur Förderung der Verhaltenstherapie; in 2000 he received his "Approbation" according to German law.

In 1976, Wittchen worked at the Central Institute of Mental Health in Mannheim and was appointed project leader in 1978, in the Max Planck Institute of Psychiatry (MPI-P) in Munich. In 1984, he completed his habilitation for clinical psychology at LMU Munich with publication and a monograph on "Course and Outcome of Treated and Untreated Anxiety and Depressive Disorders". While remaining head of the MPI-P research department, he was appointed as professor of clinical psychology and psychotherapy in 1984 at the University of Mannheim, where he founded the “Psychotherapy Outpatient Department” and the Institutes psychophysiological lab. 1989, Hans-Ulrich Wittchen took a sabbatical to support the World Health Organization's (WHO) division of Mental Health and the United States Department of Health and Human Services (ADAMHA) department in completing the WHO-ICD-10[9] classification and the US-DSM-III-R[8] systems, developing diagnostic tools and conducting supplementary studies.

1990 he was appointed as director of the "Department of Clinical Psychology and Epidemiology" at the MPI-P in Munich. Throughout his professional career, Wittchen repeatedly was "visiting scientist" and "visiting professor" at the National Institute of Mental Health, Bethesda, US, at the University of Michigan in Ann Arbor, USA and the Harvard University in Boston (US), where he collaborated with Lee Robins, Ron Kessler and Darrel Regier on the development of diagnostic tools and national and international epidemiological surveys.

In 2000, Wittchen was appointed as chair and director of the Institute of Clinical Psychology and Psychotherapy at TU Dresden. During the time period from 2000 to 2017, he founded the Center of Clinical Epidemiology and Longitudinal Studies (CELOS), the Neuroimaging Center (NIC) and the IAP-TU Dresden GmbH for treatment of mental disorders and the postgraduate education of psychotherapists in Dresden. After retiring from the position of chair in 2017, he accepted the position of a research group leader at the Department of Psychiatry and Psychotherapy of LMU Munich. His contract was suspended in April 2021 following an investigation into allegations of data fabrication, document manipulation, and whistleblower intimidation.

Prof. Wittchen is a licensed psychotherapist and still acts as CEO of the IAP-TU Dresden GmbH.

== Work ==
Prof. Wittchen is a basic and clinical researcher, focusing on the identification of causal factors for mental disorders by combining clinical psychological and psychiatric paradigms and methods with epidemiological approaches and methods. His groundbreaking studies on the course and outcome of treated and untreated anxiety and affective disorders have advanced the knowledge and improved treatment of anxiety (panic attacks, panic disorder, agoraphobia, GAD) and affective disorders particularly by developing “symptom progression” and “comorbidity” models. These studies led to the development of numerous psychotherapy manuals for anxiety and substance use disorders that after a series of randomized clinical trials have become the state-of-the-art manuals for various disorders. They also led to subsequent studies in which he explored the role of stress, trauma PTSD and substance use as well as the impact of mental disorders on neurological and somatic disease.

He also was PI and Co-PI on a number of studies on the prevalence, effects, course, care, therapy, and prevention of mental disorders in Germany and worldwide. His 2005 and 2011 studies "Size and burden of mental disorders in Europe" are among his most cited recent works.

Wittchen conducts aetiological basic research on anxiety disorders, depressive disorders, stress and substance-related disorders as well as on related physical disorders. Wittchen specifically claims to have aided the discovery of generalized anxiety disorder. Fields of his studies include frequency, burdening effects, progress, treatment, therapy and prevention of mental disorders.

Since the late 90's, Wittchen has been author and co-author of the German edition of the DSM-IIIR to DSM-5 revision and he contributed substantially to the development of diagnostic instruments, such as Structured Clinical Interview for Mental Disorders (SKID) and Computer-aided International Diagnostic Interview (CIDI).

With over 840 (2018) peer review publications, he has been awarded the status of “Highly Cited” in Web of Science since the late 90's and is listed by Thomson Reuters among the World's Most Influential Scientific Minds (2015).

== Allegations of data fabrication and investigation ==
In 2019, Buzzfeed News Germany published allegations that Wittchen had ordered junior colleagues to fabricate data in a 2016–2018 survey of German psychiatric facilities. In response, TU Dresden launched a two-year investigation.

The investigatory commission's report indicated that Wittchen had ordered colleagues to fabricate data for 20 (of 93) facilities surveyed in the study, and had afterwards sought to conceal the manipulation by altering documents and intimidating whistleblowers and university administrators. The report also detailed an allegation that Wittchen had employed his daughter in the project for two years, though she was never witnessed working on the project. Following the report, Wittchen's contract with LMU Munich was suspended. As of April 2021, TU Dresden is pursuing further investigations, and the Dresden public prosecutor's office has also launched an inquiry.

== Memberships ==
Wittchen is or has been a speaker and principal investigator of many large-scale national, EU and international research programs (e.g. BMBF, ASAT, Panicnet), DETECT, GEPAD, MentDis65+, ROAMER, World Mental Health Survey, ), WMH, NCS. He has also been a Task Force Member der APA-DSM-5 Commission for Anxiety Disorders and an Executive Council Member of the European College of Neuropsychopharmacology (ECNP) and a Task Force Member of the European Brain Council (EBC) “Size, burden and cost of disorders of the brain in Europe”, and is Fellow of ECNP and the American Psychological Society (APS].

From 2012 to 2017, he has been a member of Senate of TU Dresden, has been an honorary professor for psychology at LMU Munich and an honorary professor for epidemiology and public health at Miami University, Miller School of Medicine, US.

== Publications ==
Prof. Wittchern ranks as one of the most cited scientists worldwide (Web of Science status: Highly cited, with 892 publications, H-index 117, 64.159 citations). His publications include German and English-language books as editor and author on epidemiology and treatment of mental disorders. Wittchen is author and publisher of books (both in German and in English) on epidemiology and treatment of mental disorders as well as of more than 500 peer-reviewed articles.

Prof. Wittchen is editor and author of the German textbook "Klinische Psychologie und Psychotherapie" (co-edited and co-authored by Prof. Jürgen Hoyer) as well as numerous specialist books on behavioral therapy and psychotherapy, e.g. "Exposure Therapy – Rethinking the Model" (co-authored by Dr. Peter Neudeck) "Handbuch Psychischer Störungen" und "Expositionsbasierte Therapie der Panikstörung und Agoraphobie".

He also authored several patient self-help books for depression, panic disorder, social anxiety disorder, premenstrual syndrome and other disorders (e.g. "Ratgeber Angst. Was Sie schon immer über Angst wissen wollten").

Wittchen is the founder and co-editor of various peer-review journals, e.g. Verhaltenstherapie, the International Journal of Methods in Psychiatric Research, and Archives of Women's Mental Health.

== Awards ==
- 2003: Medvantis Research Prize, Berlin (€65,000)
- 2004: ISI/WOS Top 100 Highly cited in Psychology/Psychiatry/Neuroscience
- 2010: Vice-President of the European College of Neuropsychopharmacology (ECNP)
- 2012: Wagner-Jauregg Medal for his life work from Austrian Society for Neuropsychopharmacology and Biological Psychiatry.
- 2015: Thomson Reuters lists Prof. Dr. Hans-Ulrich Wittchen among the "World's Most Influential Scientific Minds".
- Since 2010: Best Doctor Award, Focus-Ärzteliste for Anxiety Disorders.
