= International Journal of Methods in Psychiatric Research =

- Discipline: Psychiatry
- Language: English
- Edited by: Hans-Ulrich Wittchen and Daniel S. Pine

Publication details
- History: 1991–present
- Publisher: John Wiley & Sons
- Frequency: Quarterly
- Open access: Open Access
- Impact factor: 4.035 (2020)

Standard abbreviations
- ISO 4: Int. J. Methods Psychiatr. Res.

Indexing
- ISSN: 1049-8931 (print); 1557-0657 (web)
- LCCN: 2005215636
- OCLC no.: 300300258

Links
- Journal homepage; Online access; Online archive

The International Journal of Methods in Psychiatric Research is a quarterly peer-reviewed open access medical journal covering research methods in psychiatry. It was established in 1991 and is published by John Wiley & Sons. Since 2012, it has been published exclusively online. The editor-in-chief is Hans-Ulrich Wittchen (TU Dresden) and Daniel S. Pine (National Institute of Mental Health). In January 2020, the journal became fully open access. According to the Journal Citation Reports, the journal has a 2020 impact factor of 4.035, ranking it 60th out of 156 journals in the category "Psychiatry" and 41st out of 144 in the category "Psychiatry: Social Science".
