= Richard L. Jenkins =

American physician

Richard Leos Jenkins (3 June 1903 – 30 December 1991) was an American psychiatrist known for his work in child psychiatry and juvenile delinquency.

Jenkins earned his A.B. from Stanford University in 1925 and his M.D. from University of Chicago.

In the 1930s he published on intelligence and "mongolism." His work on psychometrics with Louis Leon Thurstone found that the youngest child is usually the smartest, and children of older parents are usually smarter than peers.

Jenkins held teaching appointments at several schools, including Acting Superintendent of the Institute for Juvenile Research and Associate Professor of Psychiatry at the University of Illinois College of Medicine. He served as the Veterans Administration psychiatric research chief and psychiatric evaluation project chief from 1949 to 1961. He then was appointed professor and child psychiatry division chief at the University of Iowa. He was on the committee which oversaw the second edition of the Diagnostic and Statistical Manual of Mental Disorders.

In later life he co-edited several books and self-published a volume of poems. Jenkins died in Iowa City, Iowa of a cerebral hemorrhage.

== Selected publications ==
- Thurstone LL, Jenkins RL (1931). Order of birth, parent-age, and intelligence. The University of Chicago Press, ISBN B000JNDQWM
- Jenkins RL (1932). Periodicals for child-guidance clinics. Mental hygiene, vol. XVI, no. 4, pp. 624–630, October, 1932.
- Jenkins RL (1939). Etiology of mongrelism. American Journal of Diseases of Children, 1933 45, 506-519.
- Brown AW, Jenkins RL, Cisler LE (1938). Influence of lethargic encephalitis on intelligence of children, as determined by objective tests. American Journal of Diseases of Children February 1938, vol. 55, p. 304-321.
- Jenkins RL (1939). Adoption practices and the physician. Journal of the American Medical Association, Aug. 11, 1934, vol. 103, pp. 403–408.
- Jenkins RL, Hewitt LE (1944). Types of personality structure encountered in child guidance clinics. American Journal of Orthopsychiatry, 1944.
- Jenkins RL (1946). Common syndromes in child psychiatry: I. Deviant behavior traits. II. The schizoid child. American Journal of Orthopsychiatry, vol. XVI, no.2, April, 1946.
- Hewitt LE, Jenkins RL (1946). Fundamental patterns of maladjustment: The dynamics of their origins. Springfield, IL: D. H. Green.
- Jenkins RL (1947). To Parents about Delinquency. The Quarrie Corp.
- Jenkins RL (1954). Breaking Patterns of Defeat: The Effective Readjustment of the Sick Personality. Philadelphia: JB Lippincott Co.
- Jenkins RL (1955). The Medical Significance of Anxiety. Washington DC, The Biological Science Foundation, Ltd., 1955
- Jenkins RL, Cole JO (1964). Diagnostic Classification in Child Psychiatry. Papers presented under auspices of the State University of Iowa College of Medicine and Psychopathic Hospital, the Iowa Psychiatric Society, and the American Psychiatric Association's Committee on Research American Psychiatric Association
- Tyler BB, Tyler FB, Rafferty JE, Smith LM, Hudgins BB, Jenkins RL, NurEddin E, Shapiro I (1966). The Development of Behavior Patterns in Children. Genetic Psychology Monographs. Provincetown, Mass. v. 74, 2d half (1966).
- Jenkins RL (1966). Psychiatric syndromes in children and their relation to family background. American Journal of Orthopsychiatry. 1966 Apr;36(3):450-7.
- Jenkins RL, NurEddin E, Shapiro I. Children's Behavior Syndromes and Parental Responses. Genetic Psychology Monographs 1966 Nov;74(2):261-329.
- Field E, Lester Hewitt LE, Jenkins RL (1967). Types of Delinquency and Home Background, a Validation Study of Hewitt and Jenkins' Hypothesis. Home Office Studies in the Causes of Delinquency and the Treatment of Offenders. No. 1o. London: H.M.S.O.
- Jenkins RL (1968). The varieties of children's behavioral problems and family dynamics. Am J Psychiatry. 1968 Apr;124(10):1440-5.
- Jenkins RL (1973). Behavior Disorders of Childhood and Adolescence. Thomas, ISBN 0-398-02786-2
- Harms E, Jenkins RL (1976). Understanding Disturbed Children: Professional Insights into Their Psychiatric and Developmental Problems. Special Child Publications, ISBN 0-87562-054-X
- Henn FA, Bardwell R, Jenkins RL (1980). Juvenile delinquents revisited. Adult criminal activity. Archives of General Psychiatry 37:1160-1163.
- Jenkins RL, Gowdey E (1981). Prediction of Violence: Attitudes as Projected in Sentence Completion. ISBN 978-0-398-04453-4
- Jenkins RL (1982). Verses of the Shrink-age, Or, Rhyme Against Reason. [self-published].
- Jenkins RL, Howard RL, Millard PL, eds. (1985). No Single Cause: Juvenile Delinquency and the Search for Effective Treatment. ISBN 978-0-942974-52-2
- Jenkins RL, Brown WK, eds. (1988). The Abandonment of Delinquent Behavior: Promoting the Turnaround. ISBN 978-0-275-92928-2
