= Psychiatric epidemiology =

Field which studies the causes of mental disorders in society

Psychiatric epidemiology is a field which studies the causes (etiology) of mental disorders in society, as well as conceptualization and prevalence of mental illness. It is a subfield of the more general epidemiology. It has roots in sociological studies of the early 20th century. However, while sociological exposures are still widely studied in psychiatric epidemiology, the field has since expanded to the study of a wide area of environmental risk factors, such as major life events, as well as genetic exposures. Increasingly neuroscientific techniques like MRI are used to explore the mechanisms behind how exposures to risk factors may impact psychological problems and explore the neuroanatomical substrate underlying psychiatric disorders.

Reviews on psychiatric epidemiology as a main subject were published by Tohen et al. in 2006, Kessler in 2007, and Juul & Nemeroff in 2012.

== History ==
Sociological studies of the early 20th century can be regarded as predecessors of today's psychiatric epidemiology. These studies investigated for instance how suicide rates differ between Protestant and Catholic countries or how the risk of developing schizophrenia is increased in neighborhoods characterized by high levels of social isolation. After World War 2, researchers began using community surveys to assess psychological problems. By the 1980s, inspired by the development of new diagnostic assessment instruments and reliable criteria for mental disorders outlined in the DSM-3, researchers were increasingly shifting their focus towards estimating the prevalence of mental disorders and symptoms.

As an example, in an attempt to measure the prevalence of mental illness in the United States, Lee Robins and Darrel A. Regier conducted a study called the Epidemiological Catchment Area Project which surveyed samples of the general population at five sites across America. In the study, it was found that about a third of all Americans experience mental illness at some point in their lives. This statistic is often referred to as lifetime prevalence.

Today, epidemiological studies focus on the etiology of mental disorders, i.e. the identification and quantification of causes underlying psychiatric problems and their mechanisms, rather than mere estimation of prevalence. It is not ethically possible to experimentally expose study participants to stressors suspected to cause psychiatric disorders, thus epidemiological techniques are required to study the etiology. For this purpose longitudinal studies, which follow children and adults for a long period of time, often for many years, are particularly useful. These allow the study of naturally occurring exposures and how they affect changes in psychiatric symptoms. Two notable historical studies focusing on etiology are the Dunedin Multidisciplinary Health and Development Study and the Christchurch Health and Development Study. These studies began in the 70's and studied the impact of perinatal problems, genetic variants, sexual abuse and other adverse exposures on psychological problems in childhood and later in adulthood.

== Assessment of disorders ==
Many different instruments are used to assess mental disorders in epidemiological studies depending on the age of the participants, available recourses and other considerations. Studies featuring adolescents and adults often use structured interviewing, a technique in which interviewers administer a series of questions to determine whether an individual is disordered or nondisordered. Alternatively, questionnaire are used, which can be administered more easily. In epidemiological studies featuring children, psychopathology is often assessed using parent report, however, multi-informant approaches, e.g. the simultaneous use of parent, teachers and self-report, is popular as well.

== Exposures studied ==
=== Genetic ===
Psychiatric disorders show substantial heritability according to twin studies. A meta-analysis of most twin-studies conducted found a combined heritability of 46% for psychiatric disorders. Given the large contribution of genetic variants on psychiatric disorders, one major focus of psychiatric epidemiology is psychiatric genetics. A combination of family and molecular studies are used within psychiatric epidemiology to uncover the effects of genetics on mental health. Twin studies estimate the influences of all genetic variants and effects, but, due to relying purely on relatedness information, are limited in explaining the specific genetic mechanisms and architecture underlying psychiatric traits. Molecular studies confirm findings from family studies that genetic variants can partly explain the occurrence of psychological problems, e.g. by quantifying the total contribution of common genetic variants. Furthermore, an increasing number of specific genetic loci are being associated with psychiatric disorders in large genome-wide association studies

=== Environmental ===
In addition to genetic exposures, a wide range of environmental factors is also being studied, including nutrition, urbanicity, stressful life events, and bullying. In contrast to genetic studies, the investigation of environmental exposures of psychiatric problems face the question of bidirectional causality. For example, both directions of causation are possible: experiencing social stress might cause depression, or being depressed might worsen relationships with others and thus cause social stress (or it may even be the case that both interact, possibly as a self-reinforcing feedback loop). Finding an association between the occurrence of an environmental exposure and a disorder could be the result of either or both situations. Multiple strategies exist in psychiatric epidemiology to assess the direction of causality. One possibility is measuring the exposure and outcome multiple times. Researchers can then analyze how much a change in psychiatric symptoms can be attributed to the exposure at a previous time point, but also whether changes in the exposure can be predicted by previous symptom levels (cross-lagged model). Such a model was e.g. applied to the study of internalizing and externalizing psychological problems and stressful life events. Both, psychiatric problems as well as life events, were measured multiple times during grade 7,8,9,10 and 12. The researchers observed that stressful life events precede both internalizing and externalizing psychological problems, but appear to be also the result of experiencing such symptoms. An alternative approach is the use of twin studies, because discordance between monozygotic twins suggests environmental effects.

=== Prenatal ===
Brain development is a complex process that starts during the early stage of embryogenesis and continues into adulthood. Studies focusing on risk factors of exposure on early brain development have found differences in brain anatomy in children of mothers that consumed marijuana compared to unexposed control subjects, emphasizing the importance of intrauterine risk factors in early brain development. Premature birth is also associated with an increased risk of childhood depression and psychiatric hospitalization in young adulthood.

== Population-based imaging studies ==
Population-based imaging studies attempt to find neurobiological substrates to explain psychiatric symptomatology. These studies have mainly used magnetic resonance imaging (MRI) sequences to study the brain at a population scale: MRI sequences can be used to noninvasively study structural (e.g. volumetric) brain differences between individuals. Other examples of MRI sequences are functional MRI (fMRI), studying activational patterns of the brain and diffusion tensor imaging (DTI), measuring the development and integrity of white matter tacts. These techniques have been used at various developmental stages, examples for each stage are discussed below.

=== Pediatric population ===
Imaging studies in children showed a significant association between autistic traits and gyrification patterns (winding patterns) of the brain on structural magnetic resonance imaging (MRI). DTI studies, focusing on white matter development, showed that cognitive ability in children is positively associated with white matter integrity, as expressed by fractional anisotropy (FA).

=== Elderly population ===
Population-based studies in a large elderly population found a significant association between vascular white matter disease and depressive symptoms.

== See also ==
- Prevalence of mental disorders
