= Velnacrine =

Active metabolite of tacrine

Names
- IUPAC name 9-amino-1,2,3,4-tetrahydroacridin-1-ol

Identifiers
CAS Number	124027-47-0; 118909-22-1 (Maleate salt)
3D model (JSmol)	Interactive image
ChEBI	CHEBI:91990
ChEMBL	ChEMBL51934
ChemSpider	3528
PubChem CID	3655
UNII	Y2P6NV151K
- InChI: InChI=1S/C13H14N2O/c14-13-8-4-1-2-5-9(8)15-10-6-3-7-11(16)12(10)13/h1-2,4-5,11,16H,3,6-7H2,(H2,14,15) Key: HLVVITIHAZBPKB-UHFFFAOYSA-N
- SMILES: C1CC(C2=C(C3=CC=CC=C3N=C2C1)N)O

Properties
Chemical formula	C_{13}H_{14}N_{2}O
Molar mass	214.268 g·mol^{−1}
- Except where otherwise noted, data are given for materials in their standard state (at 25 °C [77 °F], 100 kPa). Infobox references

Velnacrine, also known as 1-hydroxytacrine, is an inhibitor of cholinesterase enzymes. It is also a metabolite of tacrine.

== Pharmacology ==
Velnacrine is able to inhibit acetylcholinesterase (AChE), this results in elevated levels of acetylcholine, as AChE is the enzyme that hydrolyzes acetylcholine. It is also able to inhibit butyrylcholinesterase.

== Therapeutic potential ==
Velnacrine, as many other cholinergics, has been described as possibly useful to help manage symptoms of Alzheimer's disease. Some research has described the drug as having benefits over placebo and an acceptable safety profile. However, a review described available data as not proving efficacy and showing evidence of toxicity. Additionally, the FDA voted against recommending approval of velnacrine.
