= Tacrine =

Chemical compound

Clinical data
- Trade names: Cognex
- AHFS/Drugs.com: Monograph
- MedlinePlus: a693039
- Pregnancy category: AU: C
- Routes of administration: Oral, rectal
- ATC code: N06DA01 (WHO)

Legal status
- Legal status: AU: S4 (Prescription only); BR: Class C1 (Other controlled substances); UK: POM (Prescription only); US: ℞-only

Pharmacokinetic data
- Bioavailability: 2.4–36% (oral)
- Protein binding: 55%
- Metabolism: Hepatic (CYP1A2)
- Elimination half-life: 2–4 hours
- Excretion: Renal

Identifiers
- IUPAC name: 1,2,3,4-Tetrahydroacridin-9-amine
- CAS Number: 321-64-2
- IUPHAR/BPS: 6687
- DrugBank: DB00382
- ChemSpider: 1859
- UNII: 4VX7YNB537
- ChEBI: CHEBI:45980
- ChEMBL: ChEMBL95
- PDB ligand: THA (PDBe, RCSB PDB)
- CompTox Dashboard (EPA): DTXSID1037272
- ECHA InfoCard: 100.005.721

Chemical and physical data
- Formula: C_{13}H_{14}N_{2}
- Molar mass: 198.269 g·mol^{−1}
- 3D model (JSmol): Interactive image
- Melting point: 183 °C (361 °F)
- Boiling point: 358 °C (676 °F)
- SMILES: n1c3c(c(c2c1cccc2)N)CCCC3
- InChI: InChI=1S/C13H14N2/c14-13-9-5-1-3-7-11(9)15-12-8-4-2-6-10(12)13/h1,3,5,7H,2,4,6,8H2,(H2,14,15); Key:YLJREFDVOIBQDA-UHFFFAOYSA-N

Tacrine is a centrally acting acetylcholinesterase inhibitor and indirect cholinergic agonist (parasympathomimetic). It was the first centrally acting cholinesterase inhibitor approved for the treatment of Alzheimer's disease, and was marketed under the trade name Cognex. Tacrine was first synthesised by Adrien Albert at the University of Sydney in 1949. It also acts as a histamine N-methyltransferase inhibitor.

== Clinical use ==
Tacrine was the prototypical cholinesterase inhibitor for the treatment of Alzheimer's disease. William K. Summers received a patent for this use in 1989. Studies found that it may have a small beneficial effect on cognition and other clinical measures, though study data was limited and the clinical relevance of these findings was unclear.

Tacrine has been discontinued in the US in 2013, due to concerns over safety.

Tacrine was also described as an analeptic agent used to promote mental alertness.

== Adverse effects ==
Very common (>10% incidence) adverse effects include

- Increased liver function tests (LFT), with 49% of patients displaying elevated ALA
- Diarrhea
- Dizziness
- Headache
- Nausea
- Vomiting

Common (1-10% incidence) adverse effects include

- Abdominal pain
- Agitation
- Anxiety
- Ataxia — decreased control over bodily movements.
- Belching
- Confusion
- Conjunctivitis (a link to tacrine treatment has not been conclusively proven)
- Constipation
- Diaphoresis — sweating.
- Fatigue
- Hallucinations
- Indigestion
- Insomnia
- Myalgia — muscle pain
- Rash
- Rhinitis
- Somnolence
- Tremor
- Urinary incontinence
- Weight loss

Uncommon/rare (<1% incidence) adverse effects include

- Agranulocytosis (a link between treatment and this adverse effect has not been proven) — a potentially fatal drop in white blood cells, the body's immune/defensive cells.
- Hepatotoxicity (that is toxic effects on the liver)
- Ototoxicity (hearing/ear damage; a link to tacrine treatment has not been conclusively proven)
- Seizures
- Taste changes

Unknown incidence adverse effects include

- Bradycardia
- Delirium
- Depression
- Hypotension
- Suicidal ideation and behaviour
- Urinary tract infection
- Other optic effects such as glaucoma, cataracts, etc. (also not conclusively linked to tacrine treatment)

=== Overdose ===
As stated above, overdosage of tacrine may give rise to severe side effects such as nausea, vomiting, salivation, sweating, bradycardia, hypotension, collapse, and convulsions. Atropine is a popular treatment for overdose.

== Pharmacokinetics ==
Major form of metabolism is in the liver via hydroxylation of benzylic carbon by CYP1A2. This forms the major metabolite 1-hydroxy-tacrine (velnacrine) which is still active.
