= Delinquency spiral =

Psychological mechanism in adolescence

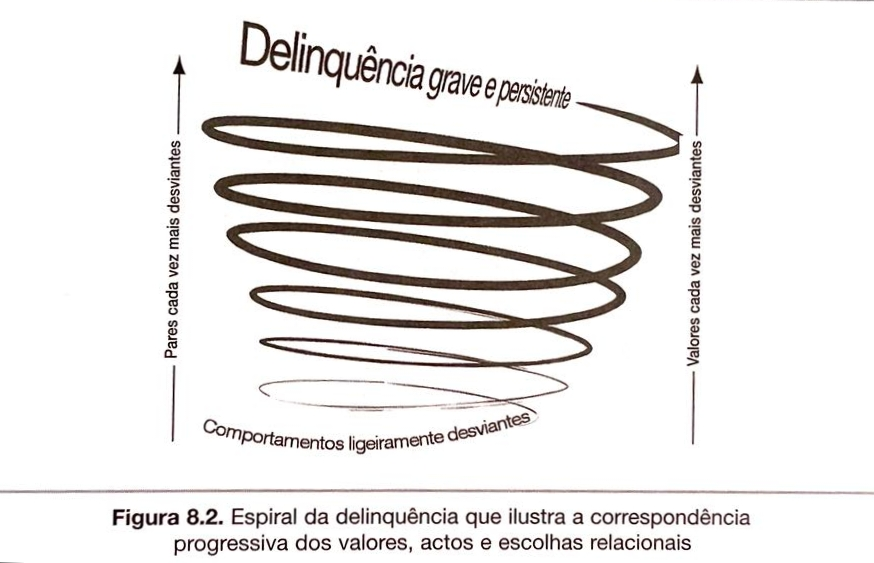
Delinquency spiral

The delinquency spiral is a psychosocial mechanism that helps understand the involvement in delinquency of certain individuals, whether adults or minors. It concerns the onset and worsening of delinquency in adolescence. It is during adolescence that young people are first confronted with peers who have delinquent values and/or behaviors. They may experience a discrepancy between their own values and behaviors and those of their peers. To reduce this dissonance, young people may either increase their involvement in delinquency or decrease it.

== Description of the process ==
The concept of delinquency spiral, as a psychosocial mechanism, must be differentiated from the fairly common use of the violence spiral in scenarios such as armed conflicts like between Israel and Hamas in Gaza in 2023, domestic violence, or during protests and riots like those in France in 2023 or U.S. universities in 2024. Michel Born's delinquency spiral (1983) is useful in criminology, juvenile criminology, developmental psychology, adolescent psychology, and social psychology. For instance, presenting ways of entering into delinquency, the Brussels police wrote in 2022, "Numerous studies highlight the crucial role of the group in learning and transmitting criminal behaviors (attitudes and techniques) through imitation, especially among young people. In criminology, through their differential association theory, Sutherland and Cressey (1992) showed the role of interactions in this learning. The individual also adopts the group's values, which may include motivations and justifications for criminal activity. By highlighting what he called the 'delinquent spiral,' Born considered that one chooses their friends based on the similarity of shared values and behaviors, which mutually reinforces deviant behaviors. He adds that the choice of behaviors often corresponds to integrating a peer group constituting one's 'reference group." Born proposed the definition and description of this mechanism of delinquency spiral. The origin of the spiral lies in the internal conflicts generated by behaviors opposed to collective norms. In this case, there is a tendency for the individual to neutralize the conflict. They may then either change this behavior, justify it, minimize it, shift responsibility, or change reference groups. Therefore, the individual will tend to associate with groups that convey the same norms, thus mutually reinforcing deviant behaviors. (Born, 1983, p. 146). The identification of this mechanism is based on Born's analysis of a sample of 185 young people interviewed not only about their delinquency but also about their family situation, occupations, and values.

A stepwise regression statistical analysis revealed that the choice of delinquent behavior in adolescence often corresponds to a choice of environment, namely, a peer group that constitutes the reference group. One does not choose friends randomly; instead, one follows a relational logic that considers the alignment of values and similarity of behaviors. Circular processes occur where the adolescent aligns their values with the environment they frequent. Behavior shapes the selection of values, and this choice influences the adoption of certain behaviors. This understanding of the delinquency spiral mechanism is based on findings related to learning, particularly social learning described by Albert Bandura, and processes of symbolic interactionism, especially cognitive dissonance reduction theory.

"Deviant ideas exist in every individual, but it is the sequences of choices of values, environments, and behaviors that will minimize or maximize deviance throughout personal development, especially during adolescence. Those who have integrated certain values and wish to protect or develop them will be led to choose environments that facilitate the emergence of behaviors consistent with these values. Thus, we can speak of a 'chosen environment' in the sense Étienne De Greeff (1946) understood it, i.e., in the context of delinquency, as an environment conducive to crime. The person who engages in acts consistent with the chosen environment will gradually develop the values (potentially asocial or antisocial) underlying these behaviors and the environment. Deviant behaviors – like any other social behavior – are dependent on choices of environments and values." (Glowacz and Born, Psychology of Delinquency, 2017, p. 218)

The delinquency spiral applies, mutatis mutandis, to addictions and substance abuse since a spiral of dependence can be triggered within a peer group, for example, occasional cannabis smokers. This spiral gains strength if financial gain is derived from trafficking and selling the product, thereby completely altering the consumer's lifestyle. This spiral can be reversed either to protect the at-risk youth from affiliating with a group of delinquent or substance-abusing peers. This reversal then becomes part of the mechanisms involved in resilience as proposed by Boris Cyrulnik. This mechanism should be utilized in interventions with young delinquents to support their transition out of delinquency
