= William Sommers (disambiguation) =

William Sommers or William Somers may refer to:

- Will Sommers (died 1560), court jester of Henry VIII of England
- William Somers (born c.1850), Scottish international footballer
- Bill Sommers (William Dunn Sommers, 1923–2000), American professional baseball player
- William P. Sommers (died 2007), CEO of SRI International, 1993–1998
- William Thomas Somers (1916–1994), mayor of Atlantic City, New Jersey, 1969–1972
