= American Journal of Orthopsychiatry =

- Discipline: Psychiatry
- Language: English
- Edited by: Kendell L. Coker, Ryan P. Kilmer

Publication details
- History: 1930-present
- Publisher: American Psychological Association on behalf of the Global Alliance for Behavioral Health and Social Justice (United States)
- Frequency: Bimonthly
- Impact factor: 2.364 (2020)

Standard abbreviations
- ISO 4: Am. J. Orthopsychiatry

Indexing
- CODEN: AJORAG
- ISSN: 0002-9432 (print); 1939-0025 (web)
- LCCN: 34039751
- OCLC no.: 712800414

Links
- Journal homepage; Online archive

The American Journal of Orthopsychiatry is a bimonthly peer-reviewed medical journal covering orthopsychiatry. It is published by the American Psychological Association on behalf of the Global Alliance for Behavioral Health and Social Justice and the editors-in-chief are Jill D. McLeigh (University of Colorado School of Medicine) and William Spaulding (University of Nebraska–Lincoln).

== Abstracting and indexing ==
The journal is abstracted and indexed in:

- Scopus,
- Academic ASAP
- Academic OneFile
- Academic Search Premier
- Arts & Humanities Citation Index
- CINAHL Plus
- Embase
- Expanded Academic ASAP
- International Bibliography of the Social Sciences
- InfoTrac Custom
- MEDLINE/PubMed
- PASCAL
- ProQuest
- PsycINFO
- Science Citation Index Expanded
- Social Sciences Citation Index
- SocINDEX

According to the Journal Citation Reports, the journal has a 2020 impact factor of 2.364.
