= Emily Simonoff =

British psychiatrist

Emily Simonoff is Professor of Child and Adolescent Psychiatry in the Child and Adolescent Mental Health Services (CAMHS) Neuropsychiatry Service, head of the Child and Adolescent Psychiatry department at the Institute of Psychiatry and lead for the CAMHS Clinical Academic Group at King's Health Partners, King's College London.

== Career and research ==
The daughter of Eugene Simonoff (a Jewish-American New York publishing executive turned mergers & acquisitions executive) and his wife Elizabeth Sage (freelance writer), Simonoff is chair of the Mental Health Research Network for treatment of children with mental health problems and a member of the NICE guideline development group for treatment and diagnosis of autism in children and adolescents. She is on the editorial board of British Journal of Psychiatry.

She is a Fellow of the Royal College of Psychiatrists and a Senior Investigator at the National Institute for Health and Care Research (NIHR).

In February 2025, the National Institute for Health and Care Research (NIHR) revealed that the NHS had commissioned Emily Simonoff to lead a £10.7 million clinical trial on puberty blockers which is planned to last until 2031.

== Selected publications ==
- Simonoff, Emily, Catherine RG Jones, Andrew Pickles, Francesca Happé, Gillian Baird, and Tony Charman. "Severe mood problems in adolescents with autism spectrum disorder." Journal of Child Psychology and Psychiatry 53, no. 11 (2012): 1157–1166. doi:10.1111/j.1469-7610.2012.02600.x
- Charman, Tony, Andrew Pickles, Emily Simonoff, Susie Chandler, Tom Loucas, and Gillian Baird. "IQ in children with autism spectrum disorders: data from the Special Needs and Autism Project (SNAP)." Psychological medicine 41, no. 03 (2011): 619–627. doi:10.1017/S0033291710000991
- Angold, Adrian, Michael Prendergast, Anthony Cox, R. Harrington, Emily Simonoff, and Michael Rutter. "The child and adolescent psychiatric assessment (CAPA)." Psychological medicine 25, no. 4 (1995): 739–754. doi:10.1017/S003329170003498X
