= Samuel Guze =

American physician

Samuel Barry Guze (October 18, 1923 – July 19, 2000) was an American psychiatrist, medical educator, and researcher. A graduate of City College of New York and Washington University School of Medicine, he was an influential psychiatrist. He worked at the Washington University School of Medicine in St. Louis for most of his career. In addition to twice serving as department chair, he led the School of Medicine as Vice Chancellor for Medical Affairs (1971-1989).

Along with Eli Robins, George Winokur and others, Guze advanced psychiatry by establishing criteria for diagnosis. A short paper by Guze and Robins contained a discussion of validity from a medical perspective. and came up with five phases of research that demonstrated that a diagnostic concept represented a disease. These five phases were: clinical description, laboratory studies, delimitation from other disorders, follow-up studies and family studies. While previously two psychiatrists might interview the same patient and propose differing diagnoses, the Guze system led to great leaps in diagnostic reliability, that is, different physicians would agree more often on what the diagnosis really was. Following publication of what came to be known as the Feighner Criteria, in 1980 he helped compile Diagnostic and Statistical Manual for Mental Disorders (3rd edition). The Feighner et al publication became a "citation classic," cited 4,000 times. Diagnostic reliability is still an essential component to modern versions of the Manual.

He was also among the first psychiatrists to study twins as a way to investigate the role of heredity in mental illness and contributed to the knowledge of genetic vulnerability to alcoholism and schizophrenia.

== Papers ==
Feighner, JP, Robins, E, Guze, SB, Woodruff, RA Jr, Winokur, G, Munoz, R. Diagnostic criteria for use in psychiatric research. Arch Gen Psychiatry 1972; 26:57-63

Robins, E and Guze, SB. Establishment of diagnostic validity in psychiatric illness: its application to schizophrenia. Am J Psychiatry 1970; 126:983-987

Publication list from PubMed

== Books ==
- Guze, Samuel B. (1992). Why Psychiatry is a Branch of Medicine. Oxford: Oxford University Press. ISBN 978-0195074208.
- Guze, Samuel B. (1996). Psychiatric Diagnosis (5th ed.). Oxford: Oxford University Press. ISBN 978-0195104219.
- Guze, Samuel B. (1997). Washington University Adult Psychiatry. St. Louis: Mosby. ISBN 978-0815139935.
