= Eli Robins =

American psychiatrist

Eli Robins (1921 Texas – 1994 Washington) was an American psychiatrist who played a pivotal role in establishing the way mental disorders are researched and diagnosed today.

== Early career ==
Robins finished his medical training and residencies at Harvard Medical School, where he worked under biologically-oriented psychiatrist Mandel E. Cohen who would greatly influence his career and with whom he first developed ideas about operational definitions for psychiatric conditions (the theory of operationalization having been recently advanced by Harvard University physicist and philosopher of science Percy Williams Bridgman). Robins rejected the then-dominant psychoanalysis. He had personally undergone psychoanalysis for a year, as was the norm in psychiatric training at the time, but he described it as "silly" and did not learn to provide it. He had also seen some of its weaknesses: one of his relatives had killed himself while being treated with psychoanalytic methods for severe depression at Harvard-affiliated McLean Hospital, and Robins himself had been misdiagnosed as having hysteria a few years before, when he actually had polio.

== Move to St. Louis ==
Robins moved to the psychiatric department at Washington University School of Medicine in 1949, initially as a pharmacology fellow working in the lab of biochemist Oliver H. Lowry, author of the most cited scientific paper ever (on a method for measuring proteins).

Throughout his career he published on brain neurochemistry and histology. He would be author on more than 175 peer-reviewed articles, including on suicide, hysteria, homosexuality and depression.

In 1956–1957 he conducted a large-scale community-based study of suicides in St. Louis which involved detailed structured interviews with people who had been in regular contact with the person beforehand. This has been noted as the first completed example of a practice that was shortly thereafter termed psychological autopsy by researchers in Los Angeles (coiner Edwin S. Shneidman).

Robins became department head in 1963. He was married to Lee Robins, a sociologist associate of psychiatry at Washington University in St. Louis.

== Developing diagnostic criteria ==
Robins set out to develop specific diagnostic criteria that could be standardized among different psychiatrists. In 1951, these efforts were published in the form of diagnostic criteria for hysteria. Robins formed a close working trio with Samuel Guze and George Winokur, and in the late 1950s they developed criteria sets for a 'medical model of psychiatric disorders'. The trio were influenced by the classification system and diagnostic principles of German psychiatrist Emil Kraepelin, and more recently by a textbook Clinical Psychiatry by British psychiatrists, principally Willy Mayer-Gross who had previously worked in Germany at the same institute as Kraepelin.

Led by Robins, the trio published the so-called Feighner Criteria with John Feighner and Paula Clayton. This led to the Research Diagnostic Criteria (RDC) that Robins developed with Robert Spitzer and others. The RDC ultimately shaped the influential third edition of the Diagnostic and Statistical Manual of Mental Disorders published by the American Psychiatric Association. His wife Lee was also involved in the developments.
