= Feighner Criteria =

Set of psychiatric diagnostic criteria

The Feighner Criteria are a set of influential psychiatric diagnostic criteria developed at Washington University in St. Louis between the late 1950s to the early 1970s.

== Overview ==
The criteria are named after a psychiatric paper published in 1972 of which John Feighner was the first listed author. It became the most cited article in psychiatry for some time. The development of the criteria had been led by a trio of psychiatrists working together on the project for a medical model of psychiatric diagnosis since the late 1950s: Eli Robins, Samuel Guze and George Winokur.

Fourteen conditions were defined, including primary affective disorders (such as depression), schizophrenia, anxiety neurosis and antisocial personality disorder.

The criteria were expanded in the publication of the Research Diagnostic Criteria on which many of the criteria of the American Psychiatric Association's DSM III (1980) were based, which in turn shaped the World Health Organization's ICD manual. "The historical record shows that the small group of individuals who created the Feighner criteria instigated a paradigm shift that has had profound effects on the course of American and, ultimately, world psychiatry."

== See also ==
- Diagnostic classification and rating scales used in psychiatry
- Classification of mental disorders
