= Research Diagnostic Criteria =

The Research Diagnostic Criteria (RDC) are a collection of influential psychiatric diagnostic criteria published in late 1970s under auspices of Statistics Section NY Psychiatric Institute, authors were Spitzer, R L; Endicott J; Robins E. PMID 1153649. As psychiatric diagnoses widely varied especially between the US and Europe, the purpose of the criteria was to allow diagnoses to be consistent in psychiatric research.

Some of the criteria were based on the earlier Feighner Criteria, although many new disorders were included; "The historical record shows that the small group of individuals who created the Feighner criteria instigated a paradigm shift that has had profound effects on the course of American and, ultimately, world psychiatry."

The RDC is important in the history of psychiatric diagnostic criteria as the DSM-III was based on many of the RDC descriptions, head of DSM III Edition was R L Spitzer.

== See also ==
- Diagnostic classification and rating scales used in psychiatry
- Schedule for Affective Disorders and Schizophrenia
