= Joseph Zubin Award =

The Joseph Zubin Award may refer to three different psychology awards named in honor of the psychologist Joseph Zubin.

== Joseph Zubin Memorial Fund Award ==
The Joseph Zubin Memorial Fund Award was granted by the Joseph Zubin Memorial Fund at the Research Foundation for Mental Hygiene at the New York State Psychiatric Institute. It was established by Zubin's colleagues and family to "recognize investigators who are in an early stage of their career, but have already made significant contributions to research in any area of psychopathology." The award was co-sponsored by the University of Pittsburgh Medical Center Western Psychiatric Institute and Clinic, the University of Pittsburgh School of Medicine and the VA Pittsburgh Healthcare System. The award included an honorarium and was presented until 2010.

Recipients:

- Jonathan D. Cohen (1994)
- Keith H. Nuechterlein (1995)
- Barbara A. Cornblatt (1996)
- Elaine F. Walker (1997)
- Martha Shenton (1998)
- Adrian Raine (1999)
- Daniel N. Klein (2000)
- Tyrone Cannon (2001)
- Sohee Park (2002)
- Deanna Barch (2003)
- Eric Granholm (2004)
- Hélène Verdoux (2005)
- Ann M. Kring (2006)
- Aysenil Belger (2007)
- Greg J. Siegle (2008)
- Theodore P. Beachaine (2009)
- Gina R. Kuperberg (2010)
- No longer awarded

== Joseph Zubin Award (SRP) ==
The Joseph Zubin Award is a lifetime achievement award given by the Society for Research in Psychopathology. It was established in 1986 and officially named the Joseph Zubin Award in 1990.

Recipients:

Source: Society for Research in Psychopathology

- Joseph Zubin (1986)
- Norman Garmezy (1987)
- David Rosenthal (1989)
- Peter H. Venables (1990)
- Peter M. Lewinsohn (1991)
- Jean P. Chapman and Loren J. Chapman (1992)
- Paul E. Meehl (1993)
- Philip S. Holzman (1994)
- Myrna Weissman (1995)
- Sarnoff A. Mednick (1996)
- Martin E.P. Seligman (1997)
- Brendan A. Maher (1998)
- Aaron T. Beck (1999)
- Seymour S. Kety (2000)
- Irving I. Gottesman (2001)
- Rue L. Cromwell (2002)
- Sir Michael Rutter (2003)
- George Brown (2004)
- Martin Harrow (2005-2006)
- Milton E. Strauss (2007)
- Alan E. Kazdin (2008)
- Connie Hammen (2009)
- Elaine F. Walker (2010)
- Ian Gotlib (2011)
- Keith Nuechterlein (2012)
- Thomas Widiger (2013)
- Lauren Alloy (2014)
- Jill Hooley (2015)
- Steven Hollon (2016)
- Lee Anna Clark (2017)
- Raymond Knight (2018)

== Joseph Zubin Award (APPA) ==
The Joseph Zubin Award was established by the American Psychopathological Association in 1992 and is granted to psychologists who have "made seminal contributions to psychopathology research."

Recipients:

Source: APPA Previous Award Winners

- George Winokur (1992)
- Albert Ellis (1993)
- Alex Leighton (1994)
- Paul McHugh (1995)
- Myrna Weissman and Gerald Klerman (1996)
- Heinz Häfner (1997)
- Barton Childs (1998)
- David J. Kupfer and Ellen Frank (1999)
- Samuel B. Guze (2000)
- Robert L. Spitzer (2001)
- Bruce S. McEwen (2002)
- John Olney (2003)
- George S. Alexopoulos (2004)
- Niki Erlenmeyer-Kimling (2005)
- David Botstein (2006)
- John E. Helzer (2007)
- Bruce P. Dohrenwend (2008)
- David Shaffer (2009)
- Ezra S. Susser (2010)
- Patricia R. Cohen (2011)
- Zena Stein (2012)
- Gabrielle Carlson (2013)
- Irving I. Gottesman (2014)
- Jules Angst (2015)
- Paula J. Clayton (2016)
- John G. Gunderson (2017)
- Kenneth S. Kendler (2018)
- Evelyn J. Bromet (2019)

== See also ==
- List of psychology awards
