= Barbara A. Cornblatt =

American psychologist

- Died: January 2025
- Education: Baruch College, New School University
- Occupations: Professor at Hofstra Northwell School of Medicine, Investigator at Center for Psychiatric Neuroscience and The Feinstein Institutes for Medical Research, Director of the Recognition and Prevention Program
- Awards: Joseph Zubin Memorial Fund Award (1996)

Barbara A. Cornblatt is Professor of Psychiatry and Molecular Medicine at Hofstra Northwell School of Medicine. She is known for her research on serious mental disorders, with a specific focus on psychosis and schizophrenia. Her work was dedicated to the early identification and prevention of schizophrenia. Her efforts to find treatments to help youth with mental illness led to the development of the Recognition and Prevention Program, which she founded in 1998.

Cornblatt was awarded the Joseph Zubin Memorial Fund Award in 1996. She served as president of the Society for Research in Psychopathology (2000–01). Then won the Joseph Zubin Award again in 2020 for the Society for Research in Psychopathology.

== Biography ==
Cornblatt received an MBA degree in industrial psychology at Baruch College, City University of New York in 1977 and a Ph.D. in experimental psychology from New School University in 1978. Over the years of her research, Cornblatt has authored or co-authored 250 articles on her field of study, psychosis and schizophrenia.

Cornblatt's research program, including projects focusing on cognitive behavioral social skills training for youth at risk of psychosis, predictors and mechanisms of conversion to psychosis, and characterization of prodromal schizophrenia, has been funded by the National Institute of Mental Health of the National Institutes of Health. She worked on North American Prodrome Longitudinal Study (NAPLS-1), a large multisite longitudinal study focusing on the earliest stages of psychotic illness, with prominent clinical psychologists and psychiatrists including Tyrone Cannon, Elaine F. Walker, and Thomas McGlashan. One of the first research clinics in the United States dedicated to identifying and intervening early youth who are at risk for psychosis was Barbara A. Cornblatt's Recognition and Prevention (RAP) Program, which she found in 1988. It has since become a model for similar early intervention centers across the country.

Additionally, Cornblatt created a variation of the Continuous Performance task (CTP), a monitoring task for signs of genetic liability for schizophrenia, which has since become the test's standard version.

== Research ==
Towards a Psychosis Risk Blood Diagnostic for Persons Experiencing High-Risk Symptoms: In this study, the researchers looked at different analytes found in human blood plasma. These plasma analytes reflected inflammation, oxidative stress, hormones, and metabolism. It was discovered that individuals who are at a high-risk for psychosis have high levels of inflammation, oxidative stress, and hormone imbalances.

Cortisol Level and Risk for Psychosis: Researchers tested the cortisol contents of saliva in 256 individuals. It was discovered that patients that were at a higher risk of psychosis, or already had the diagnosis, had increased cortisol levels. This study suggests the need for future research focusing on the hormone levels of individuals with, or at risk of, psychosis.

Functional development in clinical high risk youth: Prediction of schizophrenia versus other psychotic disorders: This study was a follow-up study involving participants from the NAPLS-1 study. Researchers checked for three different signs in their patients: psychosis-risk symptoms present at baseline (these plasma analytes reflected inflammation, oxidative stress, hormones, and metabolism), onset of psychosis during the two and a half-year follow-along period of NAPLS-1, and psychotic disorder diagnosis from the Diagnostic and Statistical Manual of Mental Disorders (DSM). The study showed that people in early adolescence who showed poor social indicators were four times as likely to develop schizophrenia. Those in their late adolescence with poor social indicators were five times as likely to develop schizophrenia.

Impaired Attention, Genetics, and the Pathophysiology of Schizophrenia: This study found that the use of a Continuous Performance Test (CPT) is a cost-effective way to screen for the impaired attention that is often present in those with diagnosed schizophrenia and those at genetic risk for developing schizophrenia. Over 40 studies that used CPT testing in various formats were analyzed to draw this conclusion. The resulting recommendation is that the use of a Continuous Performance Test would be a valuable way to screen for the disorder, the results of which could then be used as a precursor for a patient entering preventative intervention programs.

Psychosis Risk Outcomes Network (ProNET): A research project created by RAP that keeps updates on drugs formed to prevent and treat psychosis. Created in 2020 this project contains sites internationally to ensure that all areas of psychosis are being reviewed within these treatments.

== Representative publications ==
- Cornblatt, B. A., Auther, A. M., Niendam, T., Smith, C. W., Zinberg, J., Bearden, C. E., & Cannon, T. D. (2007). Preliminary findings for two new measures of social and role functioning in the prodromal phase of schizophrenia. Schizophrenia Bulletin, 33(3), 688–702.
- Cornblatt, B. A., & Erlenmeyer-Kimling, L. (1985). Global attentional deviance as a marker of risk for schizophrenia: specificity and predictive validity. Journal of Abnormal Psychology, 94(4), 470–486.
- Cornblatt, B. A., & Keilp, J. G. (1994). Impaired attention, genetics, and the pathophysiology of schizophrenia. Schizophrenia Bulletin, 20(1), 31–46.
- Cornblatt, B. A., Lenzenweger, M. F., & Erlenmeyer-Kimling, L. (1989). The continuous performance test, identical pairs version: II. Contrasting attentional profiles in schizophrenic and depressed patients. Psychiatry Research, 29(1), 65–85.
- Cornblatt, B. A., Risch, N. J., Faris, G., Friedman, D., & Erlenmeyer-Kimling, L. (1988). The Continuous Performance Test, identical pairs version (CPT-IP): I. New findings about sustained attention in normal families. Psychiatry Research, 26(2), 223–238.
