= Hillside Hospital =

Hillside Hospital may refer to:

- Hillside Hospital (Pulaski), Tennessee. Purchased & rebranded 2013.
- Zucker Hillside Hospital, Queens, NY, formerly Hillside Hospital.
