= Thomas Widiger =

American clinical psychologist (born 1952)

Thomas A. Widiger
- Born: 1952 (age 72–73); Midland, Michigan, United States
- Education: Delta College (AA); University of Michigan (BA); Miami University (PhD)
- Scientific career
- Institutions: NewYork-Presbyterian Hospital; University of Kentucky

Thomas A. Widiger (born 1952) is an American clinical psychologist who researches the diagnosis and classification of psychopathology. He is a fellow of the Association for Psychological Science, editor of Personality Disorders: Theory, Research, and Treatment, and a former co-editor of the Annual Review of Clinical Psychology.

== Early life and education ==
Thomas A. Widiger was born in 1952 in Midland, Michigan. His father was a chemist at Dow Chemical Company. He had an early interest in writing in literature and attended Delta College for an associate degree in liberal arts, graduating in 1972. He then attended the University of Michigan, graduating with a bachelor's degree in 1974. Switching tracks from literature to psychology, he then enrolled in a PhD program in clinical psychology at Miami University. He graduated from Miami University in 1981 under the advisorship of Leonard Rorer.

== Career ==
After finishing his PhD, he completed an internship at NewYork-Presbyterian Hospital. In 1982 he was appointed as a faculty member at the University of Kentucky (UK). While at UK, he was on the advisory committee for DSM-III-R and served as the first research coordinator for DSM-IV. As of 2021, Widiger is still employed at UK; he has been the T. Marshall Hahn Professor of Psychology, an endowed chair, since 2006. Areas of Widiger's research include the Big Five personality traits and personality disorders. He is the editor of Personality Disorders: Theory, Research, and Treatment and former co-editor of the Annual Review of Clinical Psychology.

== Awards and honors ==
In 2009 he was awarded the Distinguished Scientist Award from the Society for a Science of Clinical Psychology. In 2013 he won the Joseph Zubin Award from the Society for Research in Psychopathology. He is an elected fellow of the Association for Psychological Science. Awarded the Bruno Klopfer Award in 2018.
