= Myrna Weissman =

American professor of epidemiology and psychiatry

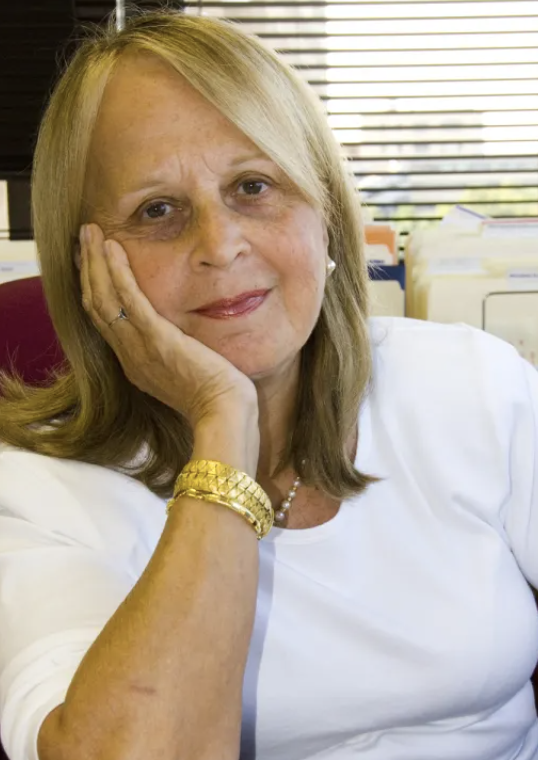
- Born: April 17, 1935 (age 91); Boston, MA, United States
- Education: Brandeis University, University of Pennsylvania, Yale School of Medicine
- Occupations: Professor of Epidemiology and Psychiatry
- Organization(s): Columbia University Vagelos College of Physicians and Surgeons, Columbia University Mailman School of Public Health, New York State Psychiatric Institute
- Known for: Interpersonal psychotherapy, Translational Epidemiology, Depression in Families

Myrna Milgram Weissman is Diane Goldman Kemper Family Professor of Epidemiology in Psychiatry at the Vagelos College of Physicians and Surgeons and Mailman School of Public Health, Columbia University, and Chief of the Division of Translational Epidemiology at the New York State Psychiatric Institute. She is an epidemiologist known for her research on the prevalence of psychiatric disorders and psychiatric epidemiology, as it pertains to rates and risks of anxiety and mood disorders across generations. Among her many influential works are longitudinal studies of the impact of parental depression on their children.

Weissman worked with Gerald Klerman in developing Interpersonal psychotherapy (IPT) as one of the first evidence-based treatments for depression. IPT is defined in a manual and now has over 140 clinical trials, numerous transitions, and adaptations. They co-authored with Bruce Rounsaville and Eva Chevron the influential volume Interpersonal Psychotherapy of Depression: A Brief, Focused, Specific Strategy. Extending the approach to adolescents, Weissman co-authored the book Interpersonal Psychotherapy for Depressed Adolescents, with Laura Mufson, Kristen Pollack Dorta, and Donna Moreau. Other books co-authored by Weissman, including The Guide to Interpersonal Psychotherapy: Updated and Expanded Edition, offered further developments of their psychotherapeutic approach. Weissman and Klerman were jointly honored by the National Academy of Medicine in 1994 as recipients of the Rhoda and Bernard Sarnat International Prize in Mental Health. In 1996, they jointly received the Joseph Zubin Award established by the American Psychopathological Association for seminal contributions to psychopathology research.

== Biography ==
Weissman completed her bachelor's degree with honors at Brandeis University in 1956. She obtained a Masters in Social Work from the University of Pennsylvania in 1958, and subsequently worked as a psychiatric social worker in Chicago, IL, Glasgow, Scotland, and at the National Institutes of Health in Bethesda, MD. Weissman completed her PhD in Chronic Disease Epidemiology at the Yale University School of Medicine in 1974, and subsequently joined the faculty of the Departments of Psychiatry and Epidemiology at Yale University of School of Medicine, where she became a Tenured Professor and remained until 1987. In 1987, Weissman became Chief of the Division of Clinical and Genetic Epidemiology, later renamed Translational Epidemiology, at the New York State Psychiatry Institute, and Professor of Epidemiology in Psychiatry at Columbia University. In 2017, she received the Diane Goldman Kemper Family Professor at Columbia.

Weissman had four children by her marriage to Sherman Weissman, including Jonathan Weissman and seven grandchildren including Rachel Weissman. She was married to her research collaborator Gerald Klerman for seven years until his death in 1992. She later married Nobel Prize laureate Marshall Nirenberg. After Nirenberg's death in 2010, Weissman submitted his papers and the Nobel Prize to the National Library of Medicine. In 2018, she married James Frauenthal, an applied Mathematician and a philanthropist.

== Research ==
Weissman is widely regarded as an expert on clinical depression. Her early work, in collaboration with Gerald Klerman, focused on the efficacy of interpersonal therapy as treatment for major depression and other disorders. She developed keen interest in maternal depression and its impact on the development of child psychopathology. In collaborative work, Weissman studied parent, the offspring, and later grandchildren of depressed parents to study the transmission of depression and other disorders across generations. She demonstrated the strong transmission and the enduring nature of depression across the lifespan Weissman and her colleagues examined gender differences in rates of depression, posttraumatic stress disorder and other conditions, and examined genetic and psychosocial factors related to depression. Weissman led a cross-national study of the epidemiology of major depression and bipolar disorder, which documented many similarities in the diagnosis of depression and bipolar disorder across countries, including the United States, Canada, France, West Germany, Italy, Lebanon, Taiwan, Korea, and New Zealand. In her current research, she is interested in bringing psychiatric epidemiology closer to translational studies in the neuroscience in order to understand mechanisms of transmission and in using large datasets to understand mechanism of transmission and to replicate findings from smaller studies. She has published over 600 scientific articles and 11 books. Her H index as of September 2021 was 182 (165869 citations) i110 index 686.

== Awards ==
Weissman has received numerous other awards for her accomplishments, including but not limited to the Rema Lapouse Award for significant contributions to psychiatric epidemiology in 1985, the Joseph Zubin Award for lifetime achievement from the Society for Research in Psychopathology in 1995, the Distinguished Service Award from the American Psychiatric Association in 2001, the Gold Medal Award from the Society of Biological Psychiatry in 2007, and Thomas William Salmon Medal from the New York Academy of Medicine in 2009. In the same year, she was selected by the American College of Epidemiology as 1 of 19 epidemiologists in the United States who has had an impact on public policy and health. The summary of her work on depression appeared in a special issue of the Annals of Epidemiology Triumphs in Epidemiology. In 2019, she was invited to give the named lecture (100 years of women) at Yale University. In 2020, she received the Pardes Humanitarian Award from the Brain and Behavioral Research Foundation. In 2021, she received the Research Prize from the American Psychiatric Association.

== Representative publications ==
Complete list of her published work in bibliography: https://www.ncbi.nlm.nih.gov/myncbi/myrna.weissman.1/bibliography/public/?sortby=pubDate&sdirection=ascending

- van Dijk, MT; Cha, J; Semanek, D; Aw, N; Gameroff, MJ; Abraham, E; Wickramaratne, PJ; Weissman, MM; Posner, J; Talati, A (2021). "Altered Dentate Gyrus Microstructure in Individuals at High Familial Risk for Depression Predicts Future Symptoms". Biol Psychiatry Cogn Neurosci Neuroimaging. 6 (1): 50–58. doi:10.1016/j.bpsc.2020.06.006. PMC 7750261. PMID 32855106..
- van Dijk, MT; Murphy, E; Posner, JE; Talati, A; Weissman, MM (2021). "Association of multigenerational family history of depression with lifetime depressive and other psychiatric disorders in children: Results from the Adolescent Brain Cognitive Development (ABCD) Study". JAMA Psychiatry. 78 (7): 778–787. doi:10.1001/jamapsychiatry.2021.0350. PMC 8060885. PMID 33881474.
- Weissman, MM; Talati, A (2021). "Thinner cortices in high-risk offspring: The promises of Big Data". Neuropsychopharmacology. 47 (1): 377–378. doi:10.1038/s41386-021-01085-4. PMC 8617168. PMID 34234289.
- Weissman, MM; Talati, A; Gameroff, MJ; Pan, L; Skipper, J; Posner, JE; Wickramaratne, PJ (2021). "Enduring problems in the offspring of depressed parents followed up to 38 years". eClinicalMedicine. 38 101000. doi:10.1016/j.eclinm.2021.101000. PMC 8283333. PMID 34308313.
- Muñoz, RF; Weissman, MM (2020). ""Fostering Healthy Mental, Emotional, and Behavioral Development in Children and Youth": National Academies Report Calling for a Decade of Children and Youth". Am J Psychiatry. 177 (9): 808–810. doi:10.1176/appi.ajp.2020.19111133. PMID 32867521..
- Weissman, MM (2020). "Big Data Begin in Psychiatry". JAMA Psychiatry. 77 (9): 967–973. doi:10.1001/jamapsychiatry.2020.0954. PMID 32401285..
- Kayser, J; Tenke, CE; Svob, C; Gameroff, MJ; Miller, L; Skipper, J; Warner, V; Wickramaratne, P; Weissman, MM (2019). "Family Risk for Depression and Prioritization of Religion or Spirituality: Early Neurophysiological Modulations of Motivated Attention". Front Hum Neurosci. 13 436. doi:10.3389/fnhum.2019.00436. PMC 6927907. PMID 31920595..
- Weissman, MM; Talati, A; Hao, X; Posner, J (2018). "Risks for Major Depression: Searching for Stable Traits". Biol Psychiatry. 83 (1): 7–8. doi:10.1016/j.biopsych.2017.10.010. PMC 5840868. PMID 29173707..
- Hao, X; Talati, A; Shankman, SA; Liu, J; Kaiser, J; Tenke, CE; Warner, V; Semanek, D; Wickramaratne, PJ; Weissman, MM; Posner, J (2017). "Stability of Cortical Thinning in Persons at Increased Familial Risk for Major Depressive Disorder Across 8 Years". Biol Psychiatry Cogn Neurosci Neuroimaging. 2 (7): 619–625. doi:10.1016/j.bpsc.2017.04.009. PMC 5659365. PMID 29085917..
- Weissman, MM; Berry, OO; Warner, V; Gameroff, MJ; Skipper, J; Talati, A; Pilowsky, DJ; Wickramaratne, P (2016). "A 30-Year Study of 3 Generations at High Risk and Low Risk for Depression". JAMA Psychiatry. 73 (9): 970–7. doi:10.1001/jamapsychiatry.2016.1586. PMC 5512549. PMID 27532344..
- Weissman, MM; Wickramaratne, P; Gameroff, MJ; Warner, V; Pilowsky, D; Kohad, RG; Verdeli, H; Skipper, J; Talati, A (2016). "Offspring of Depressed Parents: 30 Years Later". Am J Psychiatry. 173 (10): 1024–1032. doi:10.1176/appi.ajp.2016.15101327. PMID 27113122..
- Robins, L. N.; Helzer, J. E.; Weissman, M. M.; Orvaschel, H.; Gruenberg, E.; Burke, J. D.; Regier, D. A. (1984). "Lifetime prevalence of specific psychiatric disorders in three sites". Archives of General Psychiatry. 41 (10): 949–958. doi:10.1001/archpsyc.1984.01790210031005. PMID 6332590.
- Weissman, M. M.; Bland, R. C.; Canino, G. J.; Faravelli, C.; Greenwald, S.; Hwu, H. G.; Lépine, J. P. (1996). "Cross-national epidemiology of major depression and bipolar disorder". JAMA. 276 (4): 293–299. doi:10.1001/jama.1996.03540040037030. PMID 8656541.
- Weissman, M. M.; Klerman, G. L. (1977). "Sex differences and the epidemiology of depression". Archives of General Psychiatry. 34 (1): 98–111. doi:10.1001/archpsyc.1977.01770130100011. PMID 319772.
- Weissman, M. M.; Sholomskas, D.; Pottenger, M.; Prusoff, B. A.; Locke, B. Z. (1977). "Assessing depressive symptoms in five psychiatric populations: a validation study". American Journal of Epidemiology. 106 (3): 203–214. doi:10.1093/oxfordjournals.aje.a112455. PMID 900119.
