= Alexander H. Leighton =

American Canadian sociologist and psychiatrist (1908–2007)

Alexander "Alec" H. Leighton
- Born: July 17, 1908; Philadelphia, Pennsylvania, United States
- Died: August 11, 2007 (aged 99); Digby, Nova Scotia, Canada
- Citizenship: United States; Canada (from 1975)
- Spouse: Jane Murphy
- Awards: Rema Lapouse Award; Joseph Zubin Award (1994)

Academic background
- Education: Princeton University (B.A.); University of Cambridge (M.S.); Johns Hopkins Medical School (M.D.)

Academic work
- Discipline: Sociologist, psychologist
- Institutions: Cornell University; Harvard School of Public Health; Dalhousie University

Alexander H. Leighton (July 17, 1908 – August 11, 2007) was a sociologist and psychiatrist of dual citizenship (United States, by birth, and Canada, from 1975). He is best known for his work on the Stirling County (Canada) Study and his contributions to the field of psychiatric epidemiology. Leighton died at the age of 99 at his home in Digby, Nova Scotia.

== Early life ==
Alexander Hamilton Leighton was born in Philadelphia, Pennsylvania, on July 17, 1908, to Archibald Ogilvie Leighton and Gertrude Anne Leighton (née Hamilton). His sister was Gertrude Catherine Kerr Leighton (1914–1996), a specialist in international law and psychiatry.

As a young man, he became interested in photography. Using the motion picture camera, he recorded a trip he made across Nova Scotia by canoe in 1927, and in 1936 he made a film of a group of Mi'kmaw hunting porpoise in a birch bark canoe and then of making oil to sell. He also used motion picture film to record his study of beaver in their natural habitat. This study became his honours thesis at Princeton University where he received a B.A. degree in biology in 1932.

== Career ==
He received a B.A. degree from Princeton University in 1932, an M.S. from Cambridge University in England in 1934, and an M.D. from Johns Hopkins Medical School in 1936. In 1945 and 1947 he was awarded Guggenheim Fellowships. From 1946 to 1966 he was full professor in the Cornell University Department of Sociology and Anthropology and head of the Cornell Program in Social Psychiatry. During this time he also taught at the School of Labor and Industrial Relations and at the Cornell Medical School in New York. He left Cornell to work at the Harvard School of Public Health, where he was professor of social psychiatry and head of the Department of Behavioral Sciences until 1975. He left Harvard to become the Canadian National Health Scientist in the Department of Psychiatry at Dalhousie University in Halifax, Nova Scotia, where he stayed for 10 years. By 1999, he was professor emeritus, Harvard University, and professor in the departments of Psychiatry and of Community Health and Epidemiology, Dalhousie University. He served on advisory committees for the governments of Canada and the United States and for the World Health Organization.

=== Stirling County Study ===
In 1948, Alexander Leighton initiated and carried out, later joined by his wife, Dr. Jane Murphy (1929–2021) the influential Stirling County Study (a longitudinal study still in effect today), which studies the distribution of clinical depression and anxiety disorders in a Canadian study population, with comparative studies in several other communities in New York, Alaska, Nigeria, and Vietnam. His wife took over the direction of the Stirling County Study in 1975. The study is notable, among other things, for demonstrating that "the prevalence of depression has remained about 5% throughout the years and that this rate is typical of most populations in North America."

== Recognition ==
In 2003 a day-long conference, the Leighton Symposium, was held by the Canadian Anthropology Society in honour of Leighton and Jane Murphy's scientific contributions to the field of psychiatric epidemiology. Leighton was elected to the American Philosophical Society in 1950. In 1975 he was honoured with the National Health Scientist Award from Health and Welfare Canada. He was also a recipient of a Rema Lapouse Award from the American Public Health Association's Mental Health, Epidemiology, and Statistics Sections, a McAlpin Mental Health Research Achievement Award from the National Mental Health Association (now Mental Health America), and a Joseph Zubin Award from the American Psychopathological Association (1994). Since 1999, the Canadian Psychiatric Association and Canadian Academy of Psychiatric Epidemiology have bestowed the "Alex Leighton Joint CPA-CAPE Award in Psychiatric Epidemiology" upon an individual or group of individuals "who have contributed significantly to advancing and diffusing Canadian psychiatric epidemiology through innovative studies, methods, teaching or transfer of knowledge. It can relate to lifelong activities or to a recent significant achievement by more junior scientists."

== Bibliography ==
- The Governing of Men (1945: ISBN 0-691-08607-9, 1968: ISBN 0-691-02451-0) (online review), a social science book based on his work in a Japanese relocation center at Poston, Arizona
  "After 15 months at Arizona's vast Poston Relocation Center as a social analyst, Commander Leighton concluded that many an American simply fails to remember that U.S. Japanese are human beings.}
- Human Relations in a Changing World: Observations on the Uses of the Social Sciences (1949)
- My Name is Legion. Foundations for a Theory of Man in Relation to Culture (1959) (online review), on effects of sociocultural factors on personality and psychiatric disorders
- Further Explorations in Social Psychiatry (editor, with Berton H. Kaplan) (1976 ISBN 0-465-02589-7), about etiological components of psychiatric disorders
- Caring for Mentally Ill People: Psychological and Social Barriers in Historical Context (1982, ISBN 0-521-23415-8)
- Approaches to Cross-Cultural Psychiatry (with Jane M. Murphy) (1965)
- Come Near (1971, ISBN 0-393-08617-8), a novel
