= Margaret Gatz =

American psychologist, gerontologist and researcher

Margaret Gatz is a senior scientist and professor of psychology at the University of Southern California's Center for Economic and Social Research. She was elected a Fellow of the American Association for the Advancement of Science in 2012.

== Selected publications ==
- Birren, JE; Schaie, KW; Abeles, RP; Gatz, M; Salthouse, TA, eds. (2001). Handbook of the psychology of aging. Gulf Professional Publishing. ISBN 9780121012632. OCLC 47194031.
- Fiske, A; Wetherell, JL; Gatz, M (2009). "Depression in older adults". Annual Review of Clinical Psychology. 5: 363–389. doi:10.1146/annurev.clinpsy.032408.153621. PMC 2852580. PMID 19327033.
- Charles, ST; Reynolds, CA; Gatz, M (2001). "Age-related differences and change in positive and negative affect over 23 years". Journal of Personality and Social Psychology. 80 (1): 136–151. doi:10.1037/0022-3514.80.1.136. PMID 11195886.
- Gatz, M; Reynolds, CA; Fratiglioni, L; Johansson, B; Mortimer, JA; Berg, S; Fiske, A; Pedersen, NL (2006). "Role of genes and environments for explaining Alzheimer disease". Archives of General Psychiatry. 63 (2): 168–174. doi:10.1001/archpsyc.63.2.168. PMID 16461860. S2CID 25671256.
