= Susan Nolen-Hoeksema =

American psychologist (1959–2013)

Susan K. Nolen-Hoeksema
- Nolen-Hoeksema in 2003
- Born: May 22, 1959; Springfield, Illinois, United States
- Died: January 2, 2013 (aged 53); New Haven, Connecticut, United States
- Education: Yale University (BA); University of Pennsylvania (MA, PhD)
- Known for: Rumination, depression, gender
- Scientific career
- Fields: Psychology
- Workplaces: Stanford University; University of Michigan; Yale University
- Thesis: Developmental studies of explanatory style, and learned helplessness in children (depression) (1986)
- Doctoral advisor: Martin E.P. Seligman
- Doctoral students: Sonja Lyubomirsky; Brian Knutson

Susan Kay Nolen-Hoeksema (May 22, 1959 – January 2, 2013) was an American psychologist and professor at Yale University. Her research explored how mood regulation strategies could correlate to a person's vulnerability to depression, with special focus on a depression-related construct she called rumination as well as gender differences. She is credited with bringing rumination to the attention of clinical psychology, and since the time of her early writings, rumination has emerged as one of the most powerful cognitive risk factors for depression.

== Biography ==
Nolen-Hoeksema was born in Springfield, Illinois. Susan Nolen-Hoeksema attended Yale University where she received a Bachelor of Arts with a major in psychology. She graduated in 1982 summa cum laude. She then went on to University of Pennsylvania where she earned a Master of Arts (1984) and Ph.D. (1986) in clinical psychology. As a graduate student, Susan's research focused primarily on understanding the predictors of depression among children and adolescents. Nolen-Hoeksema led the Depression and Cognition Program at Yale University. Traditionally the focus of the lab was on depression; however, past and current work focused on generalized anxiety disorder, social anxiety disorder and other mood disorders.

From 1986 to 1995, she was a faculty member at Stanford University receiving tenure in 1993 and moved to the University of Michigan where she was promoted to the rank of professor and directed the institute for Research on women and gender. From 1995 to 2004 she was a tenured professor at the University of Michigan in the Personality Area. From 2004 to 2013, Nolen-Hoeksema was a professor, researcher, and the head of the Yale Depression and Cognition Program.

Susan was honored with the Yale graduate school's mentoring prize since 2005. She was the founding editor of the Annual Review of Clinical Psychology from 2005 to 2013.

She died on January 2, 2013, of complications from heart surgery to repair damage caused by a blood infection.

== Honors and awards ==
- APA committee on women in psychology's Leadership Award
- James McKeen Cattell Fellow Award, 2013 from the Association for Psychological Science.
- Nolen-Hoeksema's life work and research was honored in February 2014 by a special section in the Journal of Abnormal Psychology, volume 123, issue 1.

== Selected works ==
Nolen-Hoeksema published a dozen books, including scholarly books, textbooks, and three books for the general public on women's mental health.

- Atkinson & Hilgard's Introduction to Psychology 16th Ed." Engage Learning EMEA, 2014.
- The Power of Women: Harness Your Unique Strengths at Home, at Work, and in Your Community, 2010, Times Books
- Atkinson and Hilgard's Introduction to Psychology 15th Ed.. Wadsworth Cengage Learning: EMEA, 2009.
- Handbook of depression in adolescents (with Lori Hilt) 2008, Routledge
- Women Conquering Depression: How to Gain Control of Eating, Drinking, and Overthinking and Embrace a Healthier Life 2006, Henry Holt
- Women Who Think Too Much: How to Break Free of Overthinking and Reclaim Your Life 2003, Holt
- Atkinson & Hilgard's Introduction to Psychology 14th. Ed.. Wadsworth/Thomson Learning: Belmont, 2003.
- Coping With Loss (with Judith Larson ) 1999, Lawrence Erlbaum Associates, Publishers
- Clashing Views on Abnormal Psychology 1998, Dushkin/McGraw-Hill
- Sex Differences in Depression 1990, Stanford University Press
- Depression: Treatment and Management (2 Volumes) (with Haraton Davidian and Hamideh Jahangiri ), volume one volume two
- Psychotherapy of depression in elderly (3 Volumes) (with Hamzeh Ganji and Hamideh Jahangiri ), volume one volume two volume three
