= Barton Childs =

American geneticist (1916–2010)

- Born: February 29, 1916; Chicago
- Died: February 18, 2010 (aged 93)
- Education: Williams College; Johns Hopkins University (M.D. 1942)
- Known for: Showing that glucose-6-phosphate dehydrogenase deficiency is an X-linked recessive genetic disease; random inactivation of one of the two X-chromosomes in mammalian female cells
- Awards: E. Mead Johnson Award (Society for Pediatric Research, 1959); William Allan Award (American Society of Human Genetics, 1973); John Howland Award (American Pediatric Society, 1989); Joseph Zubin Award (American Psychopathological Association, 1998).
- Scientific career
- Fields: Pediatrics, genetics
- Institutions: Johns Hopkins University, Boston Children's Hospital

Barton Childs (February 29, 1916 – February 18, 2010) was an American pediatrician and geneticist. He received the John Howland Award, the highest award given by the American Pediatric Society (APS), in 1989.

== Early life and education ==
He was born in Chicago, Illinois, and graduated from Williams College in 1938. In 1942, he received his M.D. from Johns Hopkins University. Following military service in World War II, he returned to Johns Hopkins for a residency in pediatrics.

== Career ==
After a fellowship at Boston Children's Hospital in Boston, he returned to Johns Hopkins University in 1949, where he remained until his retirement in 1981. He remained a professor emeritus in the Department of Pediatrics at the Johns Hopkins University School of Medicine until his death.

Childs studied the genetics of adrenal hyperplasia, Crigler–Najjar syndrome, and propionic acidemia. He is known for his collaboration with William H. Zinkham, which demonstrated that Glucose-6-phosphate dehydrogenase deficiency is an X-linked recessive genetic disease. He is best known for a collaboration with Ronald Davidson and Harold Nitowsky, which demonstrated random inactivation of one of the two X-chromosomes in mammalian female cells, a mechanism of dosage compensation.

Childs was the author of many editorial pieces on genetic counseling, genetic screening, and behavioral genetics. He was a coauthor of The Metabolic and Molecular Bases of Inherited Disease, published in four volumes. In his book Genetic Medicine: A Logic of Disease, published in 1999, he argues that in the future, all medicine, or medical theory, must be based on the individuality of gene-environment interaction.

== Awards and honors ==
- 1959 E. Mead Johnson Award from the Society for Pediatric Research
- 1973 William Allan Award from the American Society of Human Genetics
- 1989 John Howland Award from the American Pediatric Society
- 1998 Joseph Zubin Award from the American Psychopathological Association.
