= Christoph U. Correll =

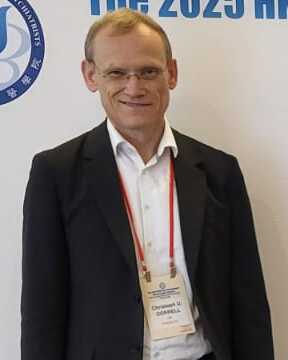
- Born: Hamburg, Germany
- Education: Free University of Berlin; University of Dundee Medical School
- Scientific career
- Fields: Psychiatry; Psychopharmacology
- Workplaces: Charité – Universitätsmedizin Berlin; Donald and Barbara Zucker School of Medicine at Hofstra/Northwell; Feinstein Institutes for Medical Research; Albert Einstein College of Medicine

Christoph Ulrich Correll is a German psychiatrist and researcher specializing in psychopharmacology and schizophrenia. He is Clinical Professor of Psychiatry at the Donald and Barbara Zucker School of Medicine at Hofstra/Northwell in New York and Professor and Chair of Child and Adolescent Psychiatry at Charité – Universitätsmedizin Berlin.

He is also the Chief Medical Officer at Medlink Global, Inc. since 2024.

== Early life and education ==
Correll was born in Hamburg, Germany. He studied medicine at the Free University of Berlin, spending a year at the University of Dundee Medical School, and earned his medical degree and doctorate in psychiatry in Germany.

In 1997, Correll relocated to the United States to start his psychiatry residency internship at Beth Israel Medical Center in New York City, completing his psychiatry residency at Zucker Hillside Hospital in Glen Oaks, New York, where he served as chief resident in 2001. He then completed a Child & Adolescent Psychiatry Fellowship at Cohen Children's Medical Center in New Hyde Park, New York, in 2003. He is board-certified in both general psychiatry and child and adolescent psychiatry.

== Career ==
Following his fellowship, Correll began his career at the Albert Einstein College of Medicine in New York, serving as assistant professor of psychiatry and behavioral sciences from 2003 to 2008, and then as associate professor from 2008 to 2010.

In 2010, Correll was appointed co-director of the Laboratory of Child and Adolescent Psychiatry at the Center for Psychiatric Neuroscience, Feinstein Institutes for Medical Research. Later that year, he joined the newly established Hofstra North Shore-LIJ School of Medicine (now the Donald and Barbara Zucker School of Medicine at Hofstra/Northwell) as associate professor of psychiatry and molecular medicine. He was promoted to full professor in 2013. Concurrently, he served as medical director of the Recognition and Prevention (RAP) Program at Zucker Hillside Hospital.

In 2017, Correll returned to Germany and became professor and chair of the Department of Child and Adolescent Psychiatry, Psychosomatic Medicine and Psychotherapy at Charité – Universitätsmedizin Berlin. He also received a W3 Professorship for Child and Adolescent Psychiatry at Charité.

Correll has also held professorships at the University Hospital Carl Gustav Carus in Dresden, Germany (2012–2016) and at Sapienza University of Rome, Italy (2017).

Since 2024, Correll has served as the Chief Medical Officer of Medlink Global, Inc.

== Research ==
His primary research focuses include early identification and intervention in severe mental illness, comparative effectiveness of psychiatric treatments, physical health in mental illness, and the cardiometabolic effects of second-generation antipsychotics.

Correll has documented the metabolic effects of second-generation antipsychotics in children and adolescents, reporting rapid weight gain and recommending routine monitoring. As a co-investigator in the NIMH RAISE early-treatment project, he helped show that coordinated, team-based intervention improves outcomes after first-episode psychosis.

== Awards and recognition ==
- 2024: Morris H. Aprison Award for Biological Psychiatry
- 2023: GISS Clinical Science Award, Robert-Sommer Research Society
- 2013: John and Maxine Bendheim Fellowship Award for Research
- 2004: Northwell Health Research Institute Faculty Research Award
- 2003: Henry Christian Award, American Federation for Medical Research
- 2003: John and Maxine Bendheim Fellowship Award for Research
