= Ann S. Masten =

American researcher of child development

Ann Masten
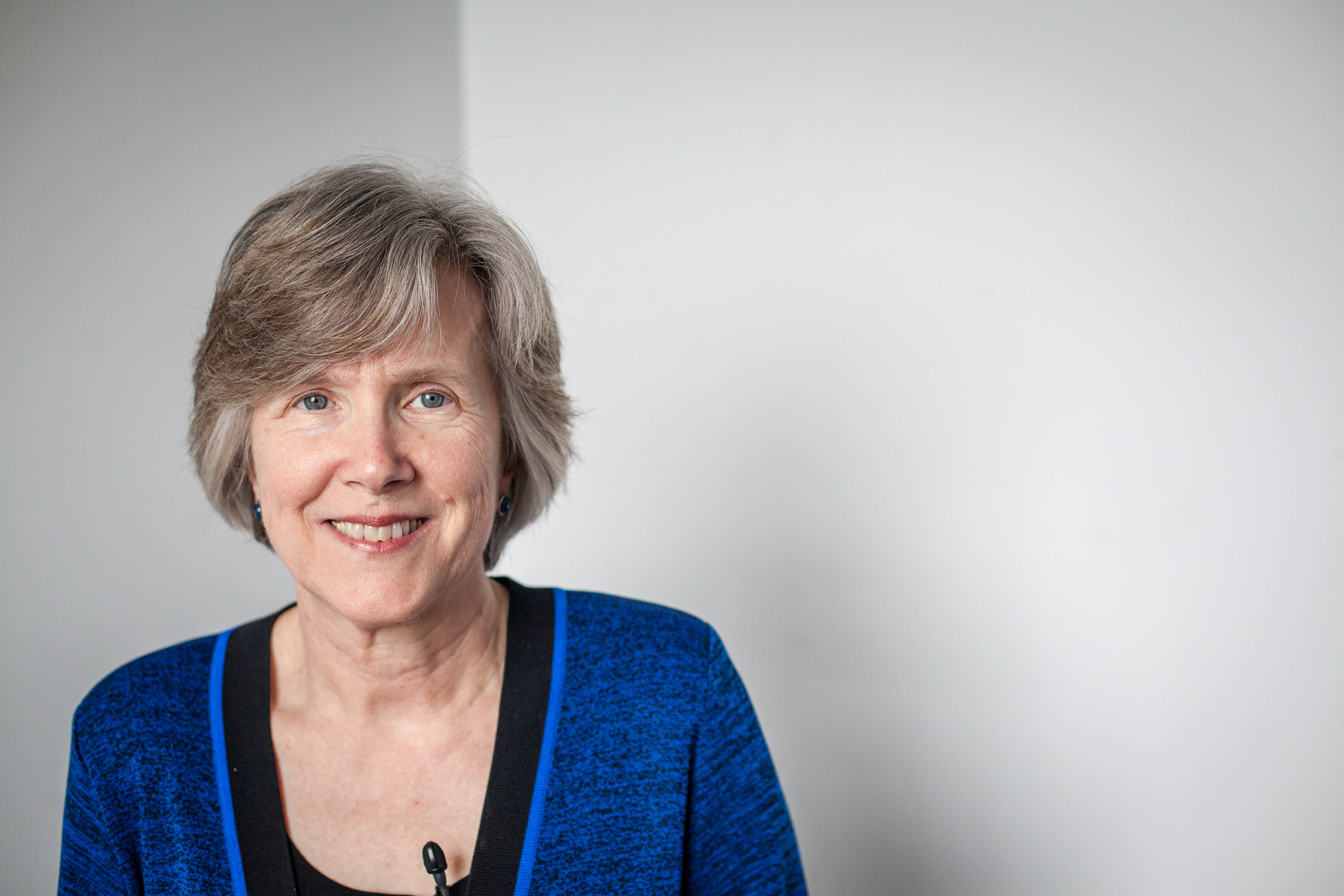
- Masten in 2012
- Born: January 27, 1951 (age 75)
- Education: Smith College, University of Minnesota
- Occupations: Professor, University of Minnesota

Ann S. Masten (born January 27, 1951) is a professor at the Institute of Child Development at the University of Minnesota known for her research on the development of resilience and for advancing theory on the positive outcomes of children and families facing adversity. Masten received the American Psychological Association Urie Bronfenbrenner Award for Lifetime Contributions to the Service of Science and Society in 2014. She has served as president of the Society for Research in Child Development and of Division 7 (Developmental) of the American Psychological Association.

Masten's book Ordinary Magic: Resilience Processes in Development provides an optimistic perspective on children's natural resilience and ability to adapt to new experiences and challenging circumstances. This monograph explores how resilience can be nurtured in families, schools, and other social and community settings. It provides a guide for policy makers seeking to develop supports for children facing adversity due to poverty, family circumstances, or exposure to traumatic violence. With Barry Lester and Bruce McEwen, Masten is co-editor of the volume Resilience in Children.

== Biography ==
Masten received her Bachelor of Arts degree cum laude in Psychology and English at Smith College in 1973. She went to graduate school at the University of Minnesota and obtained her Ph.D. in Clinical Psychology in 1982. Masten joined the faculty of the Institute for Child Development at the University of Minnesota in 1986. She holds the positions of Regents Professor of Child Development, Irving B. Harris Professor in Child Development, and Distinguished McKnight University Professor at the University of Minnesota.

Masten's research has been funded through grants from the US Department of Housing and Urban Development, the William T. Grant Foundation, the National Science Foundation, and the National Institute of Mental Health.

Masten's work is recognized internationally. In 2013, she was appointed co-chair of the new Forum on Investing in Young Children Globally by the Institute of Medicine of the National Academies. She served as the United States delegate at the International Congress on Psychology in Yokohoma, Japan in 2016, and was invited speaker at the 10th Annual Psychology Day at the United Nations in 2017. Masten teaches a MOOC on Coursera titled “Resilience in Children Exposed to Trauma, Disaster and War: Global Perspectives".

In an interview with MinnPost in 2014, Masten indicated that research by Norman Garmezy on resilience inspired her to leave her job at the National Institute of Health in 1976 to collaborate with Garmezy at the University of Minnesota. Masten directs the Project Competence on Risk and Resilience at the University of Minnesota, which aims to increase understanding of resilience, i.e., positive adaptations to challenging circumstances encompassing poverty, homelessness, war, natural disasters, migration, and everyday life. International and domestic projects aim to identify optimal interventions and strategies for disadvantaged children to increase resilience and foster their success. As an example, Masten's team works on developing strategies to help homeless kids be resilient when faced with adversity.

== Research ==
Masten's research focuses on factors that enhance the development of resilience in adolescents and families. She and her colleagues emphasize behavioral-psychosocial and neurobiological characteristics of resilience and how combining the two allows for a better understanding of resilience. Masten argues that competence and resilience are present in all children, and that all children need basic encouragement and opportunities throughout development in order to succeed. Her projects aim to inform policy makers on how to create effective environments to foster children's positive development and success. Although definitions of resilience may vary across cultures due to different standards for defining competence, across contexts, resilience is associated with processes of self-regulation and with secure attachment relationships.

In a longitudinal study of 205 children from an urban community who were followed for ten years, Masten and her colleagues used multiple methods to examine children's growth in competence, the adversities they faced, and the psychosocial resources each child had available to them, such as optimism, coping skills, a sense of mastery or personal control, and social support. Children who were higher functioning intellectually and experienced higher quality parenting had better academic outcomes, conduct, and peer social competence, even when faced with extreme adversity. In work with Karin Best and Norman Garmezy, Masten emphasizes that human psychological development is buffered which allows children to adapt when faced with challenging or threatening circumstances. Children manage adversity better when they have positive relationships with responsible adults, are good problem solvers, and are engaging and have characteristics that are valued by themselves and others. Masten and colleagues observed that long-term problems in contexts of adversity were often associated with neurobiological damage and with severe perturbations to the normal relationships of children with their caregivers.

== Representative publications ==
- Masten, A. S. (2001). Ordinary magic: Resilience processes in development. American Psychologist, 56(3), 227–238.
- Masten, A. S., & Coatsworth, J. D. (1998). The development of competence in favorable and unfavorable environments: Lessons from research on successful children. American Psychologist, 53(2), 205–220.
- Masten, A. S., Best, K. M., & Garmezy, N. (1990). Resilience and development: Contributions from the study of children who overcome adversity. Development and Psychopathology, 2(4), 425–444.
- Garmezy, N., Masten, A. S., & Tellegen, A. (1984). The study of stress and competence in children: A building block for developmental psychopathology. Child Development 55(1), 97–111.
