= Interpersonal and social rhythm therapy =

Treatment for people with bipolar disorder

Interpersonal and social rhythm therapy (IPSRT) is an intervention for people with bipolar disorder (BD). Its primary focus is stabilizing the circadian rhythm disruptions that are common among people with bipolar disorder (BD). IPSRT draws upon principles from interpersonal psychotherapy, an evidence-based treatment for depression and emphasizes the importance of daily routine (rhythm).

IPSRT was developed by Ellen Frank, PhD at the University of Pittsburgh who published a book on her theories: Treating Bipolar Disorder, a Clinician's Guide to Interpersonal and Social Rhythm Therapy. Her research on IPSRT has shown that, in combination with medication, solving interpersonal problems and maintaining regular daily rhythms of sleeping, waking, eating, and exercise can increase quality of life, reduce mood symptoms, and help prevent relapse in people with BD.

== Social Zeitgeber Hypothesis ==
Zeitgebers (“time givers”) are environmental cues that synchronize biological rhythms to the 24-hour light/dark cycle. As the sun is a physical zeitgeber, social factors are considered social zeitgebers. These include personal relationships, social demands, or life tasks that entrain circadian rhythms. Disruptions in circadian rhythms can lead to somatic and cognitive symptoms, as seen in jet lag or during daylight saving time. Individuals diagnosed with, or at risk for, mood disorders may be especially sensitive to these disruptions and thus, vulnerable to episodes of depression or mania when circadian rhythm disruptions occur.

Changes in daily routines place stress on the body's maintenance of sleep-wake cycles, appetite, energy, and alertness, all of which are affected during mood episodes. For example, depressive symptoms include disturbed sleep patterns (sleeping too much or difficulty falling asleep), changes in appetite, fatigue, and slowed movement or agitation. Manic symptoms include decreased need for sleep, excessive energy, and increase in goal-directed activity. When the body's rhythms becomes desynchronized, it can result in episodes of depression and mania.

== Aims of Treatment ==
Goals of IPSRT are to stabilize social rhythms (e.g., eating meals with other people) while improving the quality of interpersonal relationships and satisfaction with social roles. Stabilizing social rhythms helps to protect against disruptions of biological rhythms; individuals are more likely to maintain a rhythm when other people are involved to hold them accountable.

Interpersonal work can involve addressing unresolved grief experiences including grief for the lost healthy self, negotiating a transition in a major life role, and resolving a role dispute with a significant other. These experiences can be disruptive to social rhythms and thus, serve as targets of treatment to prevent the onset and recurrence of mood episodes seen in bipolar disorder.

== Phases of Treatment ==
IPSRT typically proceeds in four phases:

1. The initial phase involves a review of the patient's mental health history in order to clarify patterns in the associations between social routine disruptions, interpersonal problems and affective episodes. Psychoeducation about BD and the importance of stable routines to mood maintenance is provided. Additionally, The Interpersonal Inventory is used to assess the quality of the patient's interpersonal relationships. One of four interpersonal problem areas is chosen to focus on:
  1. Grief (e.g. loss of loved one, loss of healthy self)
  2. Role transitions (e.g. married-to-divorced, parenthood)
  3. Role disputes (e.g. conflict with spouse or parents)
  4. Interpersonal deficits (e.g. persistent social isolation) The Social Rhythm Metric (SRM) is used to assess the regularity of social routines. Target and actual time of the following activities are tracked on a daily basis: got out of bed; first contact with another person; started work, school, or housework; ate dinner; and went into bed. The intensity of involvement with other people is also rated: 0 = alone, 1 = others present, 2 = others actively involved, and 3 = others very stimulating. Finally, mood is rated on a scale of -5 to +5 at the end of each day.
2. The intermediate phase focuses on bringing regularity to social rhythms and intervening in the interpersonal problem area of interest.
  1. Social Rhythm Metric is heavily used to assess amount of activity being engaged in and the impact of activity on mood. The regularity (or irregularity) of activities is examined, and the patient and therapist collaboratively plan how to stabilize the daily routine by making incremental behavioral modifications until a regular target time at which these activities are done is achieved.
  2. Sources of interpersonal distress are explored, and individuals in the patient's life who destabilize routine, along with those who are supportive, are identified. Frequency and intensity of social interactions, as well as other social rhythms (e.g. time at which returning home from school/work and then interacting with family), are discussed.
3. The maintenance phase aims to reinforce the techniques learned earlier in treatment in order to maintain social rhythms and positive interpersonal relationships.
  1. Discussion of early warning signs of episodes are reviewed.
  2. Symptomatic and functional change is monitored at each session by asking the patient to rate their mood and note any shifts in routine using the SRM.
4. The final phase involves termination in which sessions are gradually reduced in frequency.

== Interpersonal Strategies ==
Once the interpersonal problem area of focus is chosen, the following strategies may be used:

1. Grief – This refers to symptoms resulting from incomplete mourning or unresolved feelings about the death of an important person. This can also refer to grief for the loss of a healthy self (i.e., the person before the illness or the person one could have become, if not for BD). Strategies include encouraging expression of painful feelings about lost hopes, ruined relationships, interrupted careers, and passed opportunities. This is followed by encouragement to develop new relationships, establish new, more realistic goals, and focus on future opportunities.
2. Interpersonal role disputes – This refers to any close relationship in which there are nonreciprocal expectations, such as in marital conflict and arguments with parental figures. Strategies include learning how to be more patient, tolerant, and accepting of limitations in self and others. This, in turn, can lead to fewer critical and argumentative instincts.
3. Role transition – This refers to any major life role change, such as new employment, graduation, retirement, marriage, divorce, and giving birth. This can also refer to the loss of previously pleasurable hypomania. Strategies can include noting the negative consequences of hypomania and encouraging the identification of rewarding life goals as suitable alternatives.
4. Interpersonal deficits – This refers to a long-standing history of impoverished or contentious social relationships, leading to an overall feeling of dissatisfaction. Strategies include identifying the common thread in the multiple disputes across one's life and possibly working to restore “burnt bridges”.

== Social Rhythm Strategies ==
Individuals with BD benefit from a higher level of stability in their sleep and daily routines than those with no history of affective illness. It is important to identify situations in which routines can be thrown off balance, whether by excessive activity and overstimulation or lack of activity and under-stimulation. Once destabilizing triggers are identified, reasonable goals for change are established. Specific strategies include:

1. Encouraging proper sleep hygiene to introduce regularity to sleep-wake cycle
  1. Establish a regular wake and sleep time
  2. Avoid caffeine or other stimulants
  3. Use the bed only for sleep and sex, not for watching TV, doing homework, reading etc.
  4. Align sunlight exposure with wake time to help set circadian clock
2. Maintaining regular meal times throughout the day
  1. Plan ahead by meal prepping the day before
  2. Include snack times if needed to encourage consistent eating habits
3. Encouraging medication adherence and establishing a regular schedule
  1. Use alarms on phone as reminders for when to take pills
  2. Use daily pillboxes to keep track of which pills to take at certain times
4. Monitoring frequency and intensity of social interactions using Social Rhythm Metric
  1. Note time at which interactions happen and adjust accordingly to establish regularity
5. Minimizing overstimulation of social interactions
  1. Avoid frequent parties or events
  2. Use recovery days as needed
6. Addressing under-stimulation with behavioral activation
  1. Engage in activities that are pleasurable and that give one a sense of mastery
  2. Focus on small, manageable goals that can lead to engagement in other activities (e.g., start jogging to get in shape prior to joining a basketball team)
7. Identifying interpersonal sources of stabilizing and destabilizing influence
  1. Spend time with those who are supportive and stabilizing
  2. Reduce time with those who are disruptive

== Evidence of IPSRT Efficacy ==
In a randomized controlled trial, those who received IPSRT during the acute treatment phase went longer without a new affective episode (depression or mania) than those who received intensive clinical management. Participants in the IPSRT group also had higher regularity of social rhythms at the end of acute treatment, which was associated with reduced likelihood of relapse during maintenance phase. Additionally, those who received IPSRT showed more rapid improvement in occupational functioning than those assigned to intensive clinical management. However, at the end of two years of maintenance treatment, there were no differences between treatment groups.

IPSRT was studied as one of three intensive psychosocial treatments in the NIMH-funded Systematic Treatment Enhancement Program for Bipolar Disorder (STEP-BD). STEP-BD was a long-term outpatient study investigating the benefits of psychotherapies in conjunction with pharmacotherapy in treating episodes of depression and mania, as well as preventing relapse in people with bipolar disorder. Patients were 1.58 times more likely to be well in any study month if they received intensive psychotherapy (cognitive-behavioral therapy, family focused therapy, or IPSRT) than if they received collaborative care in addition to pharmacotherapy. They also had significantly higher year-end recovery rates and shorter times to recovery.

In a trial conducted by a separate research group, 100 participants aged 15–36 years with bipolar I disorder, bipolar II disorder, and bipolar disorder not otherwise specified were randomized to IPSRT (n = 49) or specialist supportive care (n = 51). Both groups experienced improvement in depressive symptoms, social functioning, and manic symptoms, but there were no significant differences between the groups.

=== Adolescents ===
IPSRT was adapted to be delivered to adolescents with BD (IPSRT-A). In an open trial (N=12), feasibility and acceptability of IPSRT-A were high; 11/12 participants completed treatment, 97% of sessions were attended, and adolescent-rated satisfaction scores were high. IPSRT-A participants experienced significant decreases in manic, depressive, and general psychiatric symptoms over the 20 weeks of treatment. Participants’ global functioning increased significantly as well.

In an open trial aimed at prevention, adolescents (N=13) who were identified as high risk for bipolar disorder, due to having a first-degree relative with BD, received IPSRT. Significant changes in sleep/circadian patterns (i.e. less weekend sleeping in and oversleeping) were observed. Families reported high satisfaction with IPSRT, yet, on average, participants attended about half of scheduled sessions. Missed sessions were primarily associated with parental BD illness severity.

=== Group Therapy ===
IPSRT was adapted for a group therapy setting; administered over 16 sessions, in a semi-structured format. Patients (N=22) made interpersonal goals, reflected on how they managed their illness, and empathized with fellow group members. Patients were encouraged to react to each other from their own experience, express their feelings about what was said, and to give constructive feedback. Patients spent significantly less time depressed in the year following treatment than they did in the year prior to treatment.

In another small trial, patients with BD who experiencing a depressive episode (N = 9) received six IPSRT-G sessions across two weeks. Topics of discussion in group included defining interpersonal focus area, defining target times for daily routines, discussing grief and medication adherence, addressing interpersonal disputes and role transitions, and reviewing IPSRT strategies and relapse prevention. Depressive symptoms improved significantly at the end of the treatment; improvements were maintained 10 weeks following treatment end.

== See also ==
- Outline of bipolar disorder
