= Sonja Lyubomirsky =

Russian-born American professor (born 1977)

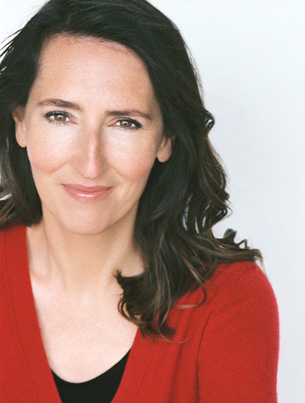
- Born: 14th December, 1976 (age 49); Russia
- Scientific career
- Fields: Psychology; Philosophy of happiness
- Workplaces: University of California, Riverside
- Thesis: The hedonic consequences of social comparison: implications for enduring happiness and transient mood (1994)
- Academic advisors: Lee Ross; Susan Nolen-Hoeksema
- Website: sonjalyubomirsky.com

Sonja Lyubomirsky (Russian: Соня Любомирская, is a Russian-born American professor in the department of psychology at the University of California, Riverside and author of The How of Happiness: A Scientific Approach to Getting the Life You Want.

== Education ==
Lyubomirsky received her B.A. from Harvard University and her Ph.D. in social/personality psychology from Stanford University.

== Awards ==
Lyubomirsky has received a John Templeton Foundation grant, a Science of Generosity grant, a Templeton Positive Psychology Prize, and a million-dollar grant (with Ken Sheldon) from the National Institute of Mental Health. In 2021, she received an honorary doctorate from the University of Basel. In 2023, Lyubomirsky was elected a Fellow of the American Association for the Advancement of Science.

== The How of Happiness ==
Breakdown of sources of happiness, according to The How of Happiness
1. Genetic (50.0%)
2. Intentional activity (40.0%)
3. Circumstance (10.0%)

The How of Happiness was published in 2008 by Penguin Press. The book has been translated into 22 languages.

The premise of The How of Happiness is that 50 percent of a given human's long-term happiness level is genetically determined, 10 percent is affected by life circumstances and situation, and a remaining 40 percent of happiness is subject to self control.

The How of Happiness led to an iPhone application called Live Happy, produced by Signal Patterns. Lyubomirsky is on the company's scientific advisory board.

The How of Happiness has also led to a song, The How of Happiness Book tune, a mnemonic to remember the content within the book.

== The Myths of Happiness ==
The Myths of Happiness, published by Penguin Press, explains why major life events that people think should make them happy often do not, and why events that people would not expect to make them happy often do.
