= Pharmacological Calvinism =

Pharmacological Calvinism is a term of disapproval purporting to describe the disapproving or condemning attitude of some Americans to the use of psychiatric medication. The term describes a perceived general distrust of drug use for purposes of restoring or attaining pleasure or happiness; that the only legitimate use of drugs is for the purpose of curing or treating illness and disease. The term was first used in 1972 by psychiatrist Gerald L. Klerman (1929–1992).

Peter D. Kramer defined the concept of pharmacological Calvinism as "a general distrust of drugs used for non-therapeutic purposes and a conviction that if a drug makes you feel good it must be morally bad".

Klerman wrote at a time when there was growing public and governmental concern about American drug use, both legal (tranquilizers) and illegal (cannabis, LSD, etc.)

It has been pointed out that, strictly speaking, Klerman misrepresented Calvinist theology in his use of this term.

== See also ==
- War on drugs
- Moral panic
