= Good Psychiatric Management =

Psychotherapy for borderline personality disorder

Good Psychiatric Management or General Psychiatric Management (GPM) is a psychodynamically informed treatment for borderline personality disorder (BPD) developed by John G. Gunderson. Initially created as a control group for BPD randomized controlled trials (RCTs), this treatment proved so effective that it was implemented and is still used today. Gunderson sought to create a treatment that could be easily used in mental health services and that integrated what he believed to be the most effective components of existing treatments. Central to the case formulation model is the interpersonal hypersensitivity of the patient diagnosed with BPD, which is believed to underlie the symptoms of this disorder and should be a primary focus of intervention.

== Treatment structure ==
GPM is presented not as a specific psychotherapy model, but as a framework for general psychiatric case management focused on patients with BPD and its comorbidities.

The central goal of GPM is to improve the patient’s quality of life and optimize functioning in relational dynamics. The structured protocol requires a minimum of 2.5 hours per week per patient. A study analyzed the effectiveness of 10 sessions of GPM as a short-term intervention within a stepped care model.

The key components of the treatment structure include:

- Weekly Psychotherapy: Offered only to those who demonstrate potential for actual change.
- Psychoeducation: A crucial element that helps restore meaning to life events, framing them as sources of corrective experience and growth.
- Interpersonal Focus: Throughout the entire treatment, the focus is maintained on the interpersonal hypersensitivity model.
- Session Structure: The intervention begins by promoting motivation and participation. Later sessions evaluate the diagnosis and co-occurring disorders. The final sessions summarize progress, often involving clinicians and family members, and formulate short-term "step up" or "step down" treatment objectives.

== Efficacy ==
A large, methodologically rigorous RCT demonstrated that GPM is as effective as Dialectical Behavioral Therapy (DBT) for BPD. Both treatments led to comparable reductions in self-harm and suicidality over a two-year follow-up, along with similar improvements in BPD symptoms, depression, and interpersonal function. GPM is a less specialized approach, requiring significantly fewer resources and less intensive staff training than DBT. The documented equivalence in patient outcomes between DBT and GPM is highly significant for healthcare providers and financiers. This comparable efficacy suggests that health systems can achieve the goal of restoring and maintaining patient health with a potentially lower-cost, less specialized intervention (GPM), improving resource allocation.

A review suggests that GPM is effective in reducing BPD-specific symptoms in patients diagnosed with BPD. It is however uncertain whether GPM is more effective than other treatments in reducing general symptoms in patients with BPD. There is no evidence for disorders other than BPD, and further studies are needed to confirm the efficacy of GPM.
