= Brian Knutson =

Brian Knutson is a psychologist and neuroscientist. Employed by Stanford University as a professor of psychology and neuroscience and director of the Symbiotic Project on Affective Neuroscience, his research focuses on the neural basis of emotion and its decision-making implications.

== Early life and education ==
Brian Knutson earned dual B.A. degrees in psychology and comparative religion, respectively, from Trinity University in 1989, and a Ph.D. in psychology from Stanford University, advised by Susan Nolen-Hoeksema, in 1993.

== Career ==
From 1993 to 1996, Knutson worked as a postdoctoral fellow with researchers at the University of California, San Francisco, and Bowling Green State University through a National Institute of Mental Health training grant. He later worked as a research fellow at the National Institute on Alcohol Abuse and Alcoholism from 1996 to 2001. Knutson joined the Stanford University psychology department as an assistant professor in 2001, before becoming an associate professor in 2008 and professor in 2016.

In 2010, Knutson was featured in the educational film The Emotional Brain.

== Research and publications ==
Knutson's research interests include the neural basis of emotion, or affective neuroscience, and its implications for decision-making (through the field of neuroeconomics) and psychopathology (in neurophenomics). According to his Google Scholar profile, Knutson has received over 45,000 citations on his publications.
