= Jonathan D. Cohen =

American psychologist and cognitive neuroscientist

- Born: October 5, 1955 (age 70); New York City, New York
- Education: Yale University; University of Pennsylvania; Carnegie Mellon University
- Known for: Neuroimaging
- Awards: Joseph Zubin Award (1994); APA Award for Distinguished Scientific Contributions to Psychology (2010)
- Scientific career
- Fields: Cognitive neuroscience Cognitive psychology
- Institutions: Princeton University
- Thesis: Attention and the processing of context: A parallel distributed processing approach to normal and disordered cognition (1990)
- Doctoral advisor: James L. McClelland

Jonathan David Cohen (born October 5, 1955) is an American psychologist and cognitive neuroscientist. He is the Robert Bendheim and Lynn Bendheim Thoman Professor in Neuroscience and Professor of Psychology at Princeton University, where he is also the founding co-director of the Princeton Neuroscience Institute. He originally joined the faculty of Princeton in 1998 and became the founding director of the Center for the Study of Brain, Mind, and Behavior in 2000. An expert on neuroimaging, he played a role in increasing the use of fMRI scanners in scientific research. He has been a fellow of the Association for Psychological Science since 2007 and of the American Association for the Advancement of Science since 2012. He is a recipient of the Joseph Zubin Memorial Fund Award, the APA Award for Distinguished Scientific Contributions to Psychology, and the Association for Psychological Science's William James Fellow Award.
