= John G. Gunderson =

American psychiatrist (1942 –2019)

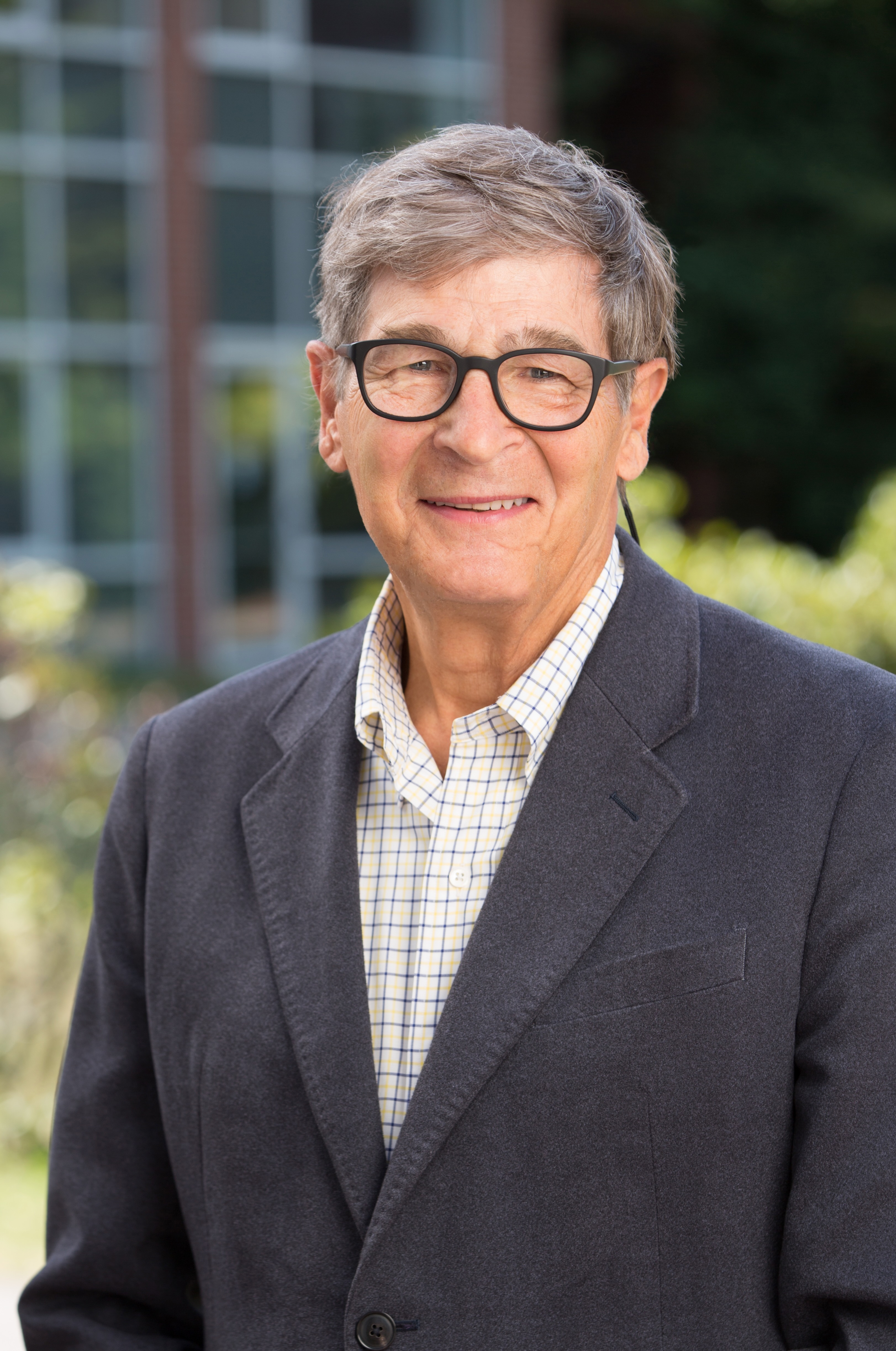
- John Gunderson in 2015
- Born: June 20, 1942; Two Rivers, Wisconsin
- Died: January 11, 2019 (aged 76); Weston, Massachusetts
- Alma Mater: Johns Hopkins University; Dartmouth Medical School (M.B.S., 1965); Harvard Medical School (M.D., 1967); Boston Psychoanalytic Institute
- Known for: Identification of borderline personality disorder as a distinct psychiatric disorder
- Fields: Psychiatry, Psychoanalysis
- Institutions: Harvard Medical School; McLean Hospital

John Gunder Gunderson (June 20, 1942 – January 11, 2019) was a psychiatrist, psychoanalyst, and professor of psychiatry at Harvard University and founder of the Borderline Center at McLean Hospital. He is best known for identifying borderline personality disorder as a distinct psychiatric syndrome.

== Education, residencies and fellowships ==
Born in Two Rivers, Wisconsin, Gunderson graduated from Johns Hopkins College in 1963, received his MBS from Dartmouth Medical School in 1965 and his MD from Harvard Medical School in 1967. Between 1967 and 1971, he was an Intern in Medicine at Hennepin County General Hospital, Resident in Psychiatry at the Massachusetts Mental Health Center, and Chief Resident in Psychiatry at the Massachusetts Mental Health Center. Between 1971 and 1973, he was a Visiting Candidate at the Washington Psychoanalytic Institute, Research Fellow at the Center for Studies of Schizophrenia, Psychiatric Assessment Section of the National Institute of Mental Health, and at the Chestnut Lodge Sanitarium. He was a Resident at the Boston Psychoanalytic Institute between 1969 and 1980.

== Career ==
Gunderson's early interest was in the area of schizophrenia, and he published with Loren Mosher an edited book on its psychotherapy in 1975. That same year, he published a seminal paper with Margaret Singer identifying borderline personality disorder (BPD) as a distinct form of psychopathology. His career thereafter shifted towards focus on the treatment of borderline patients.

Gunderson published nearly 250 papers, 100 reviews, and 12 books regarding borderline and other personality disorders. In 1984, he published a major textbook on BPD, titled Borderline Personality Disorder. According to Massachusetts General Hospital, his success led to him being called the "father" of BPD. He led the academic group that described personality disorders in the fourth edition of the Diagnostic and Statistical Manual of Mental Disorders (DSM). In 2009, McLean Hospital named a treatment center in Cambridge, Massachusetts, after him, called the "Gunderson Residence."

In the latter part of his career, Gunderson developed a treatment model called "Good Psychiatric Management" (or "General Psychiatric Management"), a psychodynamically- and behaviorally-informed psychotherapy for BPD. The development of GPM was based, in part, on research that shows that less intensive, easier-to-learn therapies could be nearly as effective as more developed approaches (DBT, TFP, MBT), and would cater to unmet needs often seen in the clinical setting. Gunderson theorized that patients with BPD suffer from a fundamental interpersonal hypersensitivity and that this problem is at the core of the various symptoms associated with the disorder.

Gunderson was opposed to attempts to obscure the borderline diagnosis through dimensionalization of personality pathology in DSM-5, ultimately arguing that both borderline and antisocial disorders should be classified separately from the rest of the personality disorders due to their clinical significance and empirical validity.

Gunderson is remembered as both a skilled psychotherapist and empirical researcher who attempted to bridge gaps between sometimes-competing approaches to BPD. His work helped open the door to the effective management of a group of patients historically deemed untreatable by traditional psychoanalysis.

== Honors and awards ==
- 2017: Joseph Zubin Award from the American Psychopathological Association

== Personal life ==
Gunderson was an accomplished artist, with many of his paintings adorning the walls of the Gunderson Residence and offices in the McLean Hospital. He was an avid golfer, gardener, fly fisherman, and played basketball into his 70s. He met his wife, Susan, on a blind date while they were college students. The couple had two children and were married for 53 years.

He died on January 11, 2019, at the age of 76 from prostate cancer in Weston, Massachusetts. Following his death, McLean renamed the BPD Training Institute the "Gunderson Personality Disorders Institute" in his honor.
