= Ellen Frank (scientist) =

American psychology professor (born 1944)

Ellen Frank (born 1944) is a psychologist and Distinguished Professor Emeritus of Psychiatry and Distinguished Professor of Psychology at the University of Pittsburgh. She is known in the field of Psychotherapy as one of the developers of Interpersonal and Social Rhythm Therapy, which aims to treat bipolar disorder by correcting disruptions in the circadian rhythm while promoting increased regularity of daily social routines. Frank is the co-founder and Chief Scientific Officer of HealthRhythms, a company that uses mobile technology to monitor the health and mental health of clients, facilitate the detection of changes in their status, and better manage mental health conditions.

Frank received the 2008 Award for Research in Mood Disorders from the American College of Psychiatrists, and the 2011 Rhoda and Bernard Sarnat International Prize in Mental Health from the National Academy of Medicine for her research on mood disorders and their treatment. She also received the 2015 James McKeen Cattell Fellow Award from the Association for Psychological Science.

== Biography ==
Ellen Frank graduated from Vassar College in 1966 with a bachelor's degree in Drama. She pursued her master's degree in English at Carnegie Mellon University. Frank worked as a research assistant with David Kupfer and Thomas Detre at the University of Pittsburgh, who inspired her to investigate the science of treatment in psychiatry. Frank completed her PhD in Clinical Psychology in 1979 at the University of Pittsburgh.

Frank is the director of the Depression and Manic Depression Prevention program at the Western Psychiatric Institute and Clinic at the University of Pittsburgh. She received a MERIT award from the National Institute of Mental Health which supported her work in developing Interpersonal and Social Rhythm Therapy.

Frank was named an honorary fellow of the American Psychiatric Association in 1991 and served as a member of the Mood Disorders Workgroup of the American Psychiatric Association DSM-V Task Force. She served as Chair of the U.S. Food and Drug Administration Psychopharmacologic Drugs Advisory Panel and as a member of the U.S. National Advisory Mental Health Council. She was elected to the National Academy of Medicine in 1999.

== Research ==
Ellen Frank is an expert on mood disorders and their treatment. She and her colleagues developed Interpersonal and Social Rhythm Therapy (IPSRT), a hybrid of Interpersonal Psychotherapy and Social Rhythm Therapy, which aims "to help people improve their moods by understanding and working with their biological and social rhythms." IPSRT assumes that disruptions in circadian and social rhythms, including eating and sleeping schedules, place vulnerable individuals at an elevated risk for onsets of episodes of depression or mania. Therapists using IPSRT aim to teach their clients how to stabilize their social routines to create order in their lives. Frank's book titled Treating Bipolar Disorder: A Clinician's Guide to Interpersonal and Social Rhythm Therapy provides a manual for beginning therapists interested in adopting this treatment approach. In collaboration Jessica Levenson, Frank co-authored the book Interpersonal Psychotherapy (Theories of Psychotherapy), which endorses interpersonal therapy as an effective and easy-to-implement treatment for depression and other mental health conditions. Some of Frank's most cited research has focused on individuals who suffer from recurrent depression; these studies examined the efficacy of interpersonal psychotherapy as maintenance treatment alone or in combination with medication in preventing relapse.

== Representative Publications ==
- Frank, E., Anderson, C., & Rubinstein, D. (1978). Frequency of sexual dysfunction in normal couples. New England Journal of Medicine, 1978(299), 111-115.
- Frank, E., Kupfer, D. J., Perel, J. M., Cornes, C., Jarrett, D. B., Mallinger, A. G., ... & Grochocinski, V. J. (1990). Three-year outcomes for maintenance therapies in recurrent depression. Archives of General Psychiatry, 47(12), 1093-1099.
- Frank, E., Kupfer, D. J., Thase, M. E., Mallinger, A. G., Swartz, H. A., Fagiolini, A. M., ... & Monk, T. (2005). Two-year outcomes for interpersonal and social rhythm therapy in individuals with bipolar I disorder. Archives of General Psychiatry, 62(9), 996-1004.
- Frank, E., Prien, R. F., Jarrett, R. B., Keller, M. B., Kupfer, D. J., Lavori, P. W., ... & Weissman, M. M. (1991). Conceptualization and rationale for consensus definitions of terms in major depressive disorder: remission, recovery, relapse, and recurrence. Archives of General Psychiatry, 48(9), 851-855.
- Frank, E., Swartz, H. A., & Kupfer, D. J. (2000). Interpersonal and social rhythm therapy: managing the chaos of bipolar disorder. Biological Psychiatry, 48(6), 593-604.
- Shear, K., Frank, E., Houck, P. R., & Reynolds, C. F. (2005). Treatment of complicated grief: A randomized controlled trial. JAMA, 293(21), 2601-2608.
