= Book tune =

Book summarised as a song

A book tune is a summary of a book in song format, acting as a mnemonic device to help readers remember what they have read. The concept was first conceived in 2010 by entrepreneur Jonathan Sauer and created in collaboration with rapper Abdominal.

Book tunes have been created for several books including The How of Happiness by Sonja Lyubomirsky and The Scarlet Letter by Nathaniel Hawthorne.
