= Journal of Abnormal Psychology =

- Discipline: Abnormal psychology
- Language: English
- Edited by: Angus MacDonald, III

Publication details
- Publisher: American Psychological Association (United States)
- Frequency: 8/year
- Impact factor: 6.673 (2020)

Standard abbreviations
- ISO 4: J. Abnorm. Psychol.

Indexing
- ISSN: 0021-843X (print); 1939-1846 (web)
- OCLC no.: 818916111

Links
- Journal homepage; Content URL

The Journal of Abnormal Psychology (formerly Journal of Abnormal Psychology and Social Psychology and Journal of Abnormal and Social Psychology) is a peer-reviewed academic journal published by the American Psychological Association (APA). The journal has been in publication for over 110 years, and it is considered to be a "preeminent outlet for research in psychopathology". Beginning in 2022, the journal became known as the Journal of Psychopathology and Clinical Science.

The Journal of Abnormal Psychology addresses the following major areas of focus:

1. psychopathology (etiology, development, symptomatology, and the course)
2. normal processes in abnormal disorders
3. pathological or atypical features of behavior of normal individuals
4. experimental studies (with human or animal subjects) relating to the abnormal emotional behavior or pathology
5. sociocultural effects on pathological processes (gender, ethnicity)
6. tests of hypotheses from psychological theories that relate to abnormal behavior

== History ==
Journal of Abnormal Psychology began publication in April 1906 under the ownership of Richard G. Badger of Boston and the editorship of Morton Prince. In 1921, the name was changed to the Journal of Abnormal Psychology and Social Psychology under the guiding assumption of the era that states of mind can only be judged to be "normal" or not against a background of the prevailing social norms of the particular time and place. In 1925, this was simplified to Journal of Abnormal and Social Psychology, the title it would go by for the next 40 years. Upon Prince's death in 1929, the journal was purchased by the American Psychological Association and the editorship fell to Henry T. Moore, the president of Skidmore College. In 1938, the prominent personality theorist Gordon W. Allport became the journal's editor. In 1965, the name reverted to simply the Journal of Abnormal Psychology, the same year that the Journal of Personality and Social Psychology began publication.

== Editors ==
The editor of the Journal of Abnormal Psychology is Angus MacDonald of University of Minnesota.

With the resources of the APA's new "online first" publication, full text manuscripts appear online as soon as the editors have completed the work. Authors must consult the APA's "Instruction for All Authors" for information regarding manuscript preparation, publication policies, permission, and figures.

== Calls for papers ==
The APA website states:

Theoretical papers of scholarly substance on abnormality may be appropriate if they advance understanding of a specific issue directly relevant to abnormal psychology and fall within the length restrictions of a regular (not extended) article. The priority is empirical papers. ... Therefore, a study that focuses primarily on treatment efficacy should be submitted to the Journal of Consulting and Clinical Psychology. However, a longitudinal study focusing on developmental influences or origins of abnormal behavior should be submitted to the Journal of Abnormal Psychology.

== Abstracting and indexing ==
The journal is abstracted and indexed by MEDLINE/PubMed and the Social Sciences Citation Index. According to the Journal Citation Reports, the journal has a 2020 impact factor of 6.673.

== See also ==
- American Psychologist
- Journal of Counseling Psychology
- Health Psychology
- Psychological Assessment
- Personality Disorders: Theory, Research, and Treatment
