= Sherman Weissman =

American geneticist

- Education: Harvard Medical School
- Known for: Sequencing the SV40 genome
- Scientific career
- Fields: Genetics
- Workplaces: Yale School of Medicine

Sherman Morton Weissman is an American scientist and the Sterling Professor of Genetics at the Yale School of Medicine. A mentor to Francis Collins, Weissman elucidated the nucleic acid sequence of the SV40 genome.

== Biography ==
Weissman was the son of a general practitioner. After attending Harvard Medical School, Weissman interned at Boston City Hospital and was a research fellow with the National Institutes of Health and the National Cancer Institute before taking a faculty position at Yale.

Weissman mentored Francis Collins, the director of the NIH, during Collins's postdoctoral fellowship at Yale. Collins called Weissman "the smartest guy" he has met and credited Weissman with allowing him to establish autonomy as a researcher. In Weissman's lab, Collins developed the technique known as chromosome jumping.

In 1978, Weissman published the complete nucleic acid sequence of the SV40 genome. A week later, Belgian researcher Walter Fiers published the genome sequence in another journal. Until 1 1/2 years earlier, the Weissman and Fiers teams had each been working on separate halves of the sequence. As technology allowed for faster sequencing, each team began to work toward sequencing the entire genome on its own. In the months before he came up with the published sequence, Weissman had to retract several "final" sequences once errors were discovered. Weissman was elected to the National Academy of Sciences in 1983.

Weissman's seven children include Jonathan Weissman, a scientist at the Massachusetts Institute of Technology. Jonathan's mother is Myrna Weissman, a professor of epidemiology in psychiatry at Columbia University.
