= Joseph Zubin =

American physician

Joseph Zubin (9 October 1900 – 18 December 1990) was a Lithuanian-born American educational psychologist and an authority on schizophrenia who is commemorated by the Joseph Zubin Awards. He was the founder of the Biometrics Research Department of New York State Psychiatric Institute.

== Life ==
Zubin was born October 9, 1900, in Raseiniai, Lithuania, but moved to the US in 1908 and grew up in Baltimore. His first degree was in chemistry at Johns Hopkins University in 1921, and he earned a PhD in educational psychology at Columbia University in 1932. In 1934 he married Winifred Anderson (who survived him) and they had three children (2 sons, David and Jonathan, and a daughter, Winfred). At his death on December 18, 1990, he had seven grandchildren.

== Honors ==
Zubin was President of both the American Psychopathological Association (1951–52) and the American College of Neuropsychopharmacology (1971–72) and received numerous awards for his work. In 1946 he was elected as a Fellow of the American Statistical Association.
