= Annual Review of Clinical Psychology =

- Discipline: Clinical psychology
- Language: English
- Edited by: Tyrone D. Cannon

Publication details
- History: 2005–present, 21 years old
- Publisher: Annual Reviews (US)
- Frequency: Annually
- Open access: Subscribe to Open
- Impact factor: 18.6 (2025)

Standard abbreviations
- ISO 4: Annu. Rev. Clin. Psychol.

Indexing
- ISSN: 1548-5943 (print); 1548-5951 (web)
- LCCN: 2004212108
- OCLC no.: 54396765

Links
- Journal homepage

The Annual Review of Clinical Psychology is a peer-reviewed academic journal that publishes an annual volume of review articles relevant to clinical psychology. It was established in 2005 and is published by Annual Reviews (AR). As of 2024, the editor is Tyrone D. Cannon; previous editors include Thomas Widiger and founding editor Susan Nolen-Hoeksema.

As of 2023, Annual Review of Clinical Psychology is being published as open access, under the Subscribe to Open model. As of 2026, Journal Citation Reports gave the journal an impact factor of 18.6, ranking it first out of 184 journals in the category "Psychology, Clinical (SSCI)" and third out of 93 journals in the category "Psychology (SCIE).

== History ==
The Annual Review of Clinical Psychology was first published in 2005 by Annual Reviews (AR), a nonprofit organization whose stated mission is to synthesize knowledge "for the progress of science and the benefit of society." Though AR already published the Annual Review of Psychology, which included a chapter of clinical psychology in each volume, the publisher decided that the field was large enough and rapidly expanding to justify its own journal. Its founding editor was Susan Nolen-Hoeksema. Upon Nolen-Hoeksema's death in 2013, Tyrone D. Cannon and Thomas Widiger became co-editors. As of 2024, Cannon became editor. Though it was initially in publication with a print volume, it is now only published electronically.

== Scope and indexing ==
The Annual Review of Clinical Psychology defines its scope as covering significant developments in the field of clinical psychology. Included subfields are theory, research, and use of psychological principles for mental disorders such as substance use, mood disorders, anxiety disorders, schizophrenia, personality disorders, and cognitive disorders. Other included topics are the diagnosis and treatment of such disorders, as well as relevant social policy and legal issues.

It is abstracted and indexed in Scopus, Science Citation Index Expanded, MEDLINE, EMBASE, CINAHL, PsycINFO, and Academic Search, among others.

== Editorial processes ==
The Annual Review of Clinical Psychology is helmed by the editor or the co-editors. The editor is assisted by the editorial committee, which includes associate editors, regular members, and occasionally guest editors. Guest members participate at the invitation of the editor, and serve terms of one year. All other members of the editorial committee are appointed by the AR board of directors and serve five-year terms. The editorial committee determines which topics should be included in each volume and solicits reviews from qualified authors. Unsolicited manuscripts are not accepted. Peer review of accepted manuscripts is undertaken by the editorial committee.

=== Current editorial board ===
As of 2025, the editorial committee consists of the editor and the following members:

- Jutta Joormann
- Bunmi Olatunji
- Pim Cuijpers
- Vonnie McLoyd
- Mitchell Prinstein
- Katie Witkiewitz
