= Atkinson & Hilgard's Introduction to Psychology =

Textbook first published in 1953

- 8th edition
- Author: Ernest Hilgard, Richard C. Atkinson, Rita L. Atkinson
- Language: English
- Genre: Psychology
- Publisher: Wadsworth Pub Co
- Publication date: 1953 (1st edition), 2009 (15th edition), 2014 (16th edition)

Atkinson & Hilgard's Introduction to Psychology is an introductory textbook on psychology written originally by Ernest Hilgard, Richard C. Atkinson and Rita L. Atkinson and edited and revised by Edward E. Smith, Daryl J. Bem, Susan Nolen-Hoeksema, Barbara L. Fredrickson, Geoff R. Loftus and Willem A. Wagenaar. Sixteen editions of Introduction to Psychology have been published between 1953 and 2014. The text is organized around the major discoveries of psychology research and is strongly biological in its approach to psychology. Eventually the book was translated into French, German, Hebrew, Hungarian, Italian, Portuguese, Romanian, Spanish, Czech, Croatian, Persian, Chinese and Japanese.
