= Bunmi Olatunji =

American psychologist

Bunmi O. Olatunji
- Born: 1977 (age 48–49)
- Education: University of Wisconsin-Stevens Point (BA); University of Arkansas (MA, PhD)
- Scientific career
- Workplaces: Vanderbilt University; Harvard University
- Thesis: Evaluative learning, emotional processing, and extinction of fear and disgust in blood-injection-injury (BII) phobia (2006)

Bunmi O. Olatunji (born 1977) is an American psychologist who is Gertrude Conaway Vanderbilt Chair in Social Sciences at Vanderbilt University. He is Director of the Emotion and Anxiety Research Laboratory and Associate Dean of Academic Affairs for the Vanderbilt University Graduate School. Olatunji studies the psychopathology of obsessive–compulsive disorder.

== Early life and education ==
Olatunji earned his bachelor's degree at the University of Wisconsin–Stevens Point. He was inducted into the Psi Chi honour society. Olatunji moved to the University of Arkansas for his graduate studies, where he earned a master's degree in clinical psychology in 2002. He remained there for his doctoral research, working alongside Jeffrey Lohr on blood-injection-injury type phobia. After completing his thesis Olatunji moved to Harvard Medical School where he worked as a psychology fellow.

== Research and career ==
In 2006 Olatunji joined Vanderbilt University. He serves as clinical Director of Rogers Behavioural Health and Director of the Emotion and Anxiety Research Laboratory. Olatunji makes use of experimental psychopathology to understand basic emotions and how they relate to anxiety disorders. During the 2009 swine flu pandemic Olatunji demonstrated that alongside the significant publicity, pandemics can cause anxiety and behavioural changes. He studied the psychological predictors of pandemic-related anxiety. he showed that general health anxiety, fears of contamination and disgust sensitivity were associated with influenza A virus subtype H1N1.

Olatunji has studied the etiology and development of obsessive–compulsive disorder (OCD). To better understand OCD, Olatunji has investigated the neural substrates of disgust. He believes that OCD can be characterised by heightened disgust learning. He studies disgust learning using functional magnetic resonance imaging (fMRI) during disgust conditioning tasks. Beyond his work on obsessive–compulsive disorder and anxiety, Olatunji has studied post-traumatic stress disorder in veterans.

In 2020 Olatunji was made Gertrude Conaway Vanderbilt Chair in Social and Natural Sciences at Vanderbilt University.

=== Academic service ===
Olatunji serves on the editorial board of several journals, including the International Journal of Cognitive Therapy, Journal of Obsessive-Compulsive and Related Disorders, Behavior Therapy and the Psychological Bulletin. In 2019 Olatunji was made Associate Dean of Academic Affairs for the Vanderbilt University Graduate School.

== Awards and honours ==
- 2009 Association for the Advancement of Behavioral and Cognitive Therapies New Researcher Award
- 2010 American Psychological Association David Shakow Early Career Award for Distinguished Scientific Contributions to Clinical Psychology
- 2014 American Psychological Association Theodore Blau Early Career Award for Distinguished Professional Contributions to Clinical Psychology
- 2015 American Psychological Association Distinguished Scientific Awards for an Early Career Contribution to Psychology

== Select publications ==
- Olatunji, Bunmi O.; Williams, Nathan L.; Tolin, David F.; Abramowitz, Jonathan S.; Sawchuk, Craig N.; Lohr, Jeffrey M.; Elwood, Lisa S. (2007). "The Disgust Scale: Item analysis, factor structure, and suggestions for refinement". Psychological Assessment. 19 (3): 281–297. doi:10.1037/1040-3590.19.3.281. ISSN 1939-134X. PMID 17845120.
- Olatunji, Bunmi O.; Cisler, Josh M.; Tolin, David F. (2007). "Quality of life in the anxiety disorders: A meta-analytic review". Clinical Psychology Review. 27 (5): 572–581. doi:10.1016/j.cpr.2007.01.015. ISSN 0272-7358. PMID 17343963.
- Otto, Michael W.; Olatunji, Bunmi O. (2011). 10-minute CBT : integrating cognitive-behavioral strategies into your practice. Oxford. ISBN 978-0-19-971301-1. OCLC 953456845.
- Olatunji, Bunmi O (2010). Cognitive behavioral therapy. Philadelphia, Pa.; London: Saunders. ISBN 978-1-4377-2491-2. OCLC 651075034.
