= Ann Kring =

American psychologist

Ann M. Kring
- Education: Ball State University; State University of New York
- Awards: Fellow AAAS (2022)
- Scientific career
- Workplaces: University of California, Berkeley
- Thesis: The relationship between emotional expression, subjective experience, and autonomic arousal in schizophrenia (1992)
- Website: ESI Lab

Ann M. Kring is an American psychologist who is a professor at the University of California, Berkeley. Her research considers schizophrenia and mental illness. She was elected Fellow of the American Association for the Advancement of Science in 2022.

== Early life and education ==
Kring was an undergraduate student at Ball State University in Indiana, where she studied psychology. She moved to the Stony Brook University for graduate research, focusing on clinical psychology. Kring considered the relationship between emotional expression and autonomic arousal in people with schizophrenia. Whilst completing her graduate studies she worked at the Bellevue Hospital.

== Research and career ==
In 1991, Kring was appointed an assistant professor at Vanderbilt University. She spent eight years at Vanderbilt, eventually becoming associate professor, before joining the University of California, Berkeley in 1999. Kring serves as Director of the Emotion & Social Interaction (ESI) Laboratory at the University of California, Berkeley. Her research considers how affective processes change in people with psychological disorders. In particular, Kring investigates how people with schizophrenia have anhedonia. Anhedonia describes the diminished capacity of people to experience pleasure.

Kring is part of the Healthy Brains Project, a long-term study that looks to identify predictors of neural outcomes.

== Awards and honors ==
- 1997 National Alliance for Research on Schizophrenia and Depression Young Investigator award
- 2006 Distinguished Teaching Award
- 2006 Joseph Zubin Memorial Fund Award
- 2022 Elected Fellow of the American Association for the Advancement of Science

== Selected publications ==
- A. M. Kring; A. H. Gordon (1 March 1998). "Sex differences in emotion: expression, experience, and physiology" (PDF). Journal of Personality and Social Psychology. 74 (3): 686–703. doi:10.1037/0022-3514.74.3.686. ISSN 0022-3514. PMID 9523412. Wikidata Q50899354.
- Anderson C; John OP; Keltner D; Kring AM (1 July 2001). "Who attains social status? Effects of personality and physical attractiveness in social groups". Journal of Personality and Social Psychology. 81 (1): 116–132. doi:10.1037/0022-3514.81.1.116. ISSN 0022-3514. PMID 11474718. Wikidata Q46795414.
