= Norman Garmezy =

American psychologist

- Born: Norman Garmezy; June 18, 1918; New York City, New York, United States
- Died: November 21, 2009 (aged 91); Nashville, Tennessee
- Education: University of Iowa
- Known for: Risk and Resilience
- Awards: Institute of Medicine, National Academy of Sciences
- Scientific career
- Fields: Psychology, developmental psychology
- Workplaces: University of Minnesota
- Doctoral advisor: I. E. Farber
- Doctoral students: Ann Masten, Dante Cicchetti

Norman Garmezy (June 18, 1918 – November 21, 2009) was a professor of psychology who is known for his work in developmental psychopathology. After receiving his Ph.D. from the University of Iowa in 1950, Garmezy held appointments at Duke University (1950–1961) and the Institute of Child Development at the University of Minnesota (1961–1989). His early work was on the etiology of schizophrenia; however, he is best known for his later work on risk, resilience, stress, and coping in child development.

== Biography ==
=== Early life ===
Norman Garmezy was born on June 18, 1918, in the Bronx, New York. His parents had immigrated from Russia as children and settled in a predominantly Jewish community. They lived in a small apartment in a Bronx tenement, which is where Garmezy was raised. While his parents had less than a high school education, they emphasized the importance of education for their children. As a result, Garmezy worked hard in school and skipped three grades in elementary school. His father was a millinery designer and worked to own his own factory, which was quite successful until the Great Depression when he was forced into bankruptcy. To support the family during these hard times, he and Garmezy's mother returned to work as machine operators in a millinery factory.

=== Education and military service ===
Garmezy was accepted to the City College of New York for his undergraduate studies in the Business Administration School. His major course of study was in economics, but he was required to take a psychology course, which captured his attention, and his interest in human behavior began to evolve during his time there. When he graduated in 1939, he decided to pursue psychology further and completed a master's in counseling at Columbia University. Following his graduation in 1940, he took a job at the Jewish Vocational Service in Cleveland. Due to antisemitism at the time, there were few other jobs that were available to him. Shortly after beginning his job there, he was drafted to serve in World War II. Garmezy was initially placed in the infantry, but wished to change positions, so he sought reassignment. By chance, he was offered a position that required him to study psychology at the University of Iowa for six months to learn about army personnel management. Garmezy attributed that instance to changing the course of his life.

After Garmezy finished his training at Iowa and was deployed to Europe, he wrote back to Kenneth Spence at the University of Iowa inquiring whether he might be accepted back to complete his doctorate. Spence wrote back saying he would allow Garmezy to work with him when he was ready. Two weeks after his discharge, Garmezy returned to Iowa to begin his studies. He spent two years at Iowa under the direction of Spence and then completed his internship at the Worcester State Hospital in Massachusetts under Elliott Rodnick, who Garmezy credits with having supervised the bulk of his dissertation work. He then returned briefly to Iowa to finish his dissertation on schizophrenia, which was chaired by I.E. Farber. He earned his Ph.D. in 1950.

=== Academic appointments ===
Garmezy's supervisor on internship, Elliot Rodnick, became the director of the clinical psychology program at Duke University while Garmezy was finishing his dissertation in Iowa and he asked Garmezy whether he would be interested in taking the Assistant Professor Chair in Clinical Psychology at Duke. Garmezy accepted and his academic career began. He spent eleven years at Duke, where he researched schizophrenia, before moving to the University of Minnesota in 1961, when he would begin to focus on child development.

=== Late life and death ===
Garmezy was diagnosed with Alzheimer's disease, and he gradually declined over the last twenty years of his life. He died in Nashville, Tennessee, on November 21, 2009.

== Research ==
=== Schizophrenia ===
Garmezy's dissertation was an early work on the process-reactive dichotomy in schizophrenia. He was interested in how two groups of people with schizophrenia could look so different, undergo such different courses, and what factors explained these differences. Particularly, he was interested in how people with reactive schizophrenia often did not need medication to improve and were previously living quite normal lives, while people with process schizophrenia were more chronically impaired over the course of their lives. This difference resulted in Garmezy developing an interest in how psychopathology can develop as the result of stressors and how the combination of risk and resilience factors over the course of one's life can affect outcomes and susceptibility to mental illness.

=== Child development: risk and resilience ===
When Garmezy arrived at the University of Minnesota and the Institute of Child Development in 1961, his course of research shifted. He began to study children and was interested in identifying children who would be more resilient in the face of stress versus those who would develop more adjustment problems. This marriage of developmental and clinical approaches was widely credited with the birth of the field of developmental psychopathology. The first major book in the field, edited by Garmezy and Michael Rutter was entitled "Stress, Coping, and Development in Children." Garmezy's studies focused on numerous factors that would moderate the relationships between genetic predisposition for the development of mental disorders and stressful life events (such as maltreatment) and the development of psychopathology. Such moderators included competence, intelligence, personality factors, social functioning, attentional factors, and others. One of Garmezy's most central projects was the Project Competence Longitudinal Study (PCLS). Findings from this project suggested that there were many dimensions to competence, that they variably continued and changed over time, and that they predicted success in adulthood. They found that children who were more competent in social, cognitive, and academic domains, were less likely to experience negative outcomes later on and that children who faced adversity in childhood but possessed these competencies looked much more like their peers who had not faced adversity in childhood. Garmezy and his students also pioneered innovative methods for studying these factors that are still used today. For example, the basis for the Revised Class Play, a method of having children in a classroom nominate their peers for different social roles, was developed for use in the PCLS.

== Representative publications ==
- Garmezy, N. (1985). Stress-resistant children: The search for protective factors. Recent research in developmental psychopathology, 4, 213–233.
- Garmezy, N. (1991). Resiliency and vulnerability to adverse developmental outcomes associated with poverty. American behavioral scientist, 34(4), 416–430.
- Garmezy, N. (1993). Children in poverty: Resilience despite risk. Psychiatry, 56(1), 127–136.
- Garmezy, N., Masten, A., & Tellegen, A. (1984). The Study of Stress and Competence in Children: A Building Block for Developmental Psychopathology. Child Development, 55(1), 97–111. doi:10.2307/1129837
- Garmezy, N. E., & Rutter, M. E. (1983). Stress, coping, and development in children. In Seminar on Stress and Coping in Children, 1979, Ctr for Advanced Study in the Behavioral Sciences, Stanford, CA, US. Johns Hopkins University Press.
