= Tyrone Cannon =

American psychologist and academic

- Born: Tyrone Douglas Cannon
- Education: Dartmouth College; University of Southern California
- Awards: Joseph Zubin Memorial Fund Award (2001)
- Scientific career
- Fields: Neuroscience; Psychiatry; Psychology
- Institutions: University of Pennsylvania; David Geffen School of Medicine at UCLA; Yale University
- Thesis: Precursors and developmental course of predominantly negative and positive forms of schizophrenia in a high-risk population (1990)
- Doctoral advisor: Sarnoff A. Mednick

Tyrone Douglas Cannon is the Clark L. Hull Professor of Psychology and Psychiatry at Yale University. His research focuses on neurobiological processes underlying psychological phenomena in people with mental illnesses, such as schizophrenia and bipolar disorder. Much of his research on schizophrenia and bipolar disorder has focused on developing approaches to prevent these disorders. A fellow of the Association for Psychological Science, he is the co-editor of the Annual Review of Clinical Psychology. He received the Joseph Zubin Memorial Fund Award from Columbia University's Department of Psychiatry in 2001.
