= Gerald Klerman =

American physician

Gerald L. Klerman
- Born: 1928; New York City, U.S.
- Died: April 3, 1992 (aged 63); New York City, U.S.
- Education: Cornell University; New York University School of Medicine
- Occupation: Psychiatrist
- Spouse: Myrna Weissman

Gerald L. Klerman (1928 – April 3, 1992) was an American psychiatrist and researcher whose work included the development of interpersonal psychotherapy, a short-term treatment for depression. He was chief of the US national mental health agency from 1977 to 1980.

== Early life and education ==
Klerman was born in New York City. He graduated from Cornell University in 1950 and was a member of the Quill and Dagger society, and graduated from New York University School of Medicine in 1954. After a year-long medical internship at Bellevue Hospital Center in New York, he went on to complete his psychiatry residency at the Massachusetts Mental Health Center in Boston.

== Career ==
Klerman's expertise included depression, schizophrenia, and anxiety disorders. From 1966 to 1970 he was on faculty at Yale University where he also held the position of director of the university's mental health center. He subsequently worked at Harvard. The term pharmacological calvinism (distrust and stigma with respect to psychiatric medication) is attributed to him.

From 1977 to 1980, he was the head of the Alcohol, Drug Abuse and Mental Health Administration, appointed by President Jimmy Carter.

Klerman's second wife, Myrna Weissman, was his collaborator for his work in interpersonal psychotherapy. Following a long history of diabetes, Klerman died of kidney disease on April 3, 1992, in New York City.

== Books authored ==
- Interpersonal Psychotherapy of Depression (with Myrna M. Weissman, Bruce J. Rounsaville, and Eve S. Chevron), 1984.
- Contemporary Directions in Psychopathology: Toward the DSM-IV, 1986.
- Weissman, Myrna M.; Markowitz, John C.; Klerman, Gerald L. (August 2017). The Guide to Interpersonal Psychotherapy: Updated and Expanded Edition. Oxford University Press. ISBN 978-0-19-066260-8; 1st edition published in 2007
