= Elaine F. Walker =

American psychologist

- Education: Washington University in St. Louis (BA); University of Missouri–St. Louis (PhD)
- Awards: Fellow of the American Association for the Advancement of Science; Member of the American Academy of Arts and Sciences
- Scientific career
- Fields: Clinical psychology, developmental psychopathology, schizophrenia research
- Workplaces: Emory University; Cornell University

Elaine F. Walker is a clinical psychologist and the Charles Howard Candler Professor of psychology and neuroscience at Emory University. Her research focuses on the development and prediction of schizophrenia and other psychotic disorders. She is a fellow of the American Association for the Advancement of Science and a member of the American Academy of Arts and Sciences.

== Biography ==
Walker received her B.A. in psychology from Washington University in St. Louis in 1974 and was an intern in the Department of Child Psychiatry at Washington University School of Medicine from 1976 to 1977. In 1979, she received her Ph.D. in Clinical Psychology from the University of Missouri and completed a post-doctorate research fellowship at the University of Southern California under the guidance of Dr. Sarnoff Mednick.

Walker began her teaching career as an instructor in psychology at California State University, Los Angeles from 1978 to 1979. She joined Cornell University in 1979 as an assistant professor in human development and family studies and psychology and was promoted to associate professor in 1985.

Since 1986, Walker has taught and conducted research at Emory University. She joined Emory as an associate professor in the departments of psychology and psychiatry and became a professor in the Department of Psychology and the graduate neuroscience program in 1989. She was the Samuel Candler Dobbs Professor from 1994 to 2016 and became the Charles Howard Candler Professor in 2016. Aside from being a professor of psychology and teaching courses in abnormal psychology, personality and psychopathology, she serves as the director of the Mental Health and Development Research Program at Emory University.

Among the positions Walker has held at Emory, she directed clinical training in psychology from 1992 to 1995 and the graduate program in clinical psychology from 1994 to 1998. She chaired the Department of Psychology from 2003 to 2006. Outside the university, she served on the executive board of the Society for Research in Psychopathology and was the society's president from 1999 to 2000. Walker also served as editor-in-chief of the Association for Psychological Science's journal Psychological Science in the Public Interest. From 2019 to 2026, she chaired the association's publications committee.

== Research ==
Walker's research is in developmental psychopathology and focuses on the developmental course of schizophrenia and related psychotic disorders. Her early studies examined emotion recognition, attention, neuropsychological functioning, and positive and negative symptoms in people with schizophrenia. She later used childhood home movies and longitudinal high-risk samples to investigate whether neuromotor, emotional and social differences could be observed before the onset of psychosis. This research examined childhood movement abnormalities, social withdrawal and emotional expression as possible early indicators of later psychotic illness.

A recurring theme in Walker's research is the interaction between neurodevelopment and stress. With Donald Diforio, she proposed a neural diathesis–stress model of schizophrenia linking neurodevelopmental vulnerability with stress-related changes in the hypothalamic–pituitary–adrenal axis, cortisol secretion and dopamine activity. Her subsequent work examined changes in stress sensitivity during puberty and adolescence, including the relationships among cortisol, hormones, stressful experiences and emerging psychotic symptoms.

Since the 2000s, Walker has studied adolescents and young adults considered to be at clinical high risk for psychosis. Through the North American Prodrome Longitudinal Study, she has investigated factors associated with the persistence or remission of attenuated symptoms and the transition to psychosis. This work has combined longitudinal clinical assessments with measures of movement, cognition, social functioning, neuroendocrine activity, neuroimaging, electroencephalography, inflammation and genetic risk. She has also contributed to studies developing individualized models for estimating psychosis risk.

Her later research has examined negative symptoms and functional outcomes, as well as the relationships of childhood adversity, discrimination, neighborhood conditions, sleep, substance use and social engagement with psychosis risk. She has also studied 22q11.2 deletion syndrome and 3q29 microdeletion syndrome as genetic models of neurodevelopmental vulnerability to psychosis.

== Honors and awards ==
- 1983–1988 – William T. Grant Foundation Faculty Scholar
- 1995 – Alexander Gralnick, M.D., Award for Research in Schizophrenia, American Psychological Foundation
- 1996 – Joseph Zubin Memorial Fund Award
- 1997 – University Scholar/Teacher Award, Emory University
- 2010 – Joseph Zubin Award, Society for Research in Psychopathology
- 2013 – James McKeen Cattell Fellow Award, Association for Psychological Science
- 2016 – John Neale Sustained Mentorship Award, Society for Research in Psychopathology
- 2018 – Fellow of the American Association for the Advancement of Science
- 2023 – George P. Cuttino Award for Excellence in Mentoring, Emory University
- 2026 – Elected member of the American Academy of Arts and Sciences

== Selected books ==
- Harvey, P. D.; Walker, E. F., Eds. (1987). Positive and Negative Symptoms in Psychosis: Description, Research and Future Directions. Erlbaum.
- Walker, E. F., ed. (1991). Schizophrenia: A Life-Course Developmental Perspective. Academic Press.
- Walker, E. F.; Dworkin, R.; Cornblatt, B., eds. (1992). Progress in Experimental Personality and Psychopathology Research. Springer.
- Rosenhan, D.; Seligman, M.; Walker, E. F. (2001). Abnormal Psychology. Norton Publishing Company.
- Cicchetti, D.; Walker, E. F., eds. (2003). Neurodevelopmental Mechanisms in Psychopathology. Cambridge University Press.
- Romer, D.; Walker, E. F., eds. (2007). Adolescent Psychopathology and the Developing Brain: Integrating Brain and Prevention Science. Oxford University Press.

== Selected works ==
- Walker, E., Savoie, T., & Davis, D. (1994). Neuromotor precursors of schizophrenia. Schizophrenia Bulletin, 20, 441–452. doi:10.1093/schbul/20.3.441
- Walker, E. F., & Diforio, D. (1997). Schizophrenia: A neural diathesis-stress model. Psychological Review, 104(4), 667–685. doi:10.1037/0033-295X.104.4.667
- Walker, E. F., Walder, D. J., & Reynolds, F. (2001). Developmental changes in cortisol secretion in normal and at-risk youth. Development and Psychopathology, 13(3), 721–732. doi:10.1017/S0954579401003169
- Walker, E., Mittal, V., & Tessner, K. (2008). Stress and the hypothalamic–pituitary–adrenal axis in the developmental course of schizophrenia. Annual Review of Clinical Psychology, 4(1), 189–216. doi:10.1146/annurev.clinpsy.4.022007.141248
- Walker, E. F., & Goldsmith, D. R. (2022). Schizophrenia: A scientific graveyard or a pragmatically useful diagnostic construct? Schizophrenia Research, 242, 141. doi:10.1016/j.schres.2022.01.022
- Walker, E. (2022). The permeable boundary between biological and psychological processes in the origins of psychosis. Psychiatry Research, 317, 114853. doi:10.1016/j.psychres.2022.114853
- Sefik, E., Boamah, M., Addington, J., Bearden, C. E., Cadenhead, K. S., Cornblatt, B. A., et al. (2023). Sex- and age-specific deviations in cerebellar structure and their link with symptom dimensions and clinical outcome in individuals at clinical high risk for psychosis. Schizophrenia Bulletin, 49(2), 350–363. doi:10.1093/schbul/sbac169
- Ku, B. S., Collins, M., Anglin, D. M., Diomino, A. M., Addington, J., Bearden, C. E., et al. (2023). Associations between childhood ethnoracial minority density, cortical thickness, and social engagement among minority youth at clinical high-risk for psychosis. Neuropsychopharmacology, 48(12), 1707–1715. doi:10.1038/s41386-023-01649-6
- Ku, B. S., Aberizk, K., Feurer, C., Yuan, Q., Druss, B. G., Jeste, D. V., & Walker, E. F. (2024). Aspects of area deprivation index in relation to hippocampal volume among children. JAMA Network Open, 7(6), e2416484. doi:10.1001/jamanetworkopen.2024.16484
- Walker, E. F., Aberizk, K., Yuan, E., Bilgrami, Z., Ku, B. S., & Guest, R. M. (2024). Developmental perspectives on the origins of psychotic disorders: The need for a transdiagnostic approach. Development and Psychopathology, 36(5), 2559–2569. doi:10.1017/S0954579424000397
- Guest, R. M., Aberizk, K., Addington, J., Bearden, C. E., Cadenhead, K. S., Cannon, T. D., et al. (2025). Cultural variables influence performance on the MATRICS Consensus Cognitive Battery among people at clinical high risk for psychosis. Schizophrenia Research, 280, 60–68. doi:10.1016/j.schres.2025.04.019
