= Barry Lester =

American psychiatrist

Barry Marshall Lester (born August 8, 1947, in Bronx, New York) is an American professor of psychiatry and human behavior and pediatrics at Brown University's Alpert Medical School and Women & Infants Hospital. He is a Fellow of the American Association for the Advancement of Science and the American Psychological Association.

== Education ==
Lester received a Bachelor of Arts degree from Boston University in 1969. He earned a Master of Arts degree in psychology in 1970 and a Ph.D. in psychology in 1973 from Michigan State University. He completed a postdoctoral fellowship in developmental psychology at Harvard Medical School and Boston Children's Hospital from 1976 to 1978.

== Career ==
Lester is Professor of Psychiatry and Human Behavior and Professor of Pediatrics at the Warren Alpert Medical School of Brown University. He is affiliated with Women & Infants Hospital of Rhode Island and has served as Director of the Center for the Study of Children at Risk. His research focuses on prenatal substance exposure, infant mental health, child development, developmental psychopathology, neurodevelopment, and epigenetics. He has also served as President of the International Association for Infant Mental Health and has authored more than 250 peer-reviewed scientific publications and over 100 book chapters.
