= Hillside Hospital (Pulaski) =

Geography
- Location: Pulaski, Tennessee, United States
- Coordinates: 35.18916°N 87.00408°W

Services
- Beds: 95

Links
- Lists: Hospitals in Tennessee

Hillside Hospital is a for profit Hospital with 95 beds located on 1265 East College Street in Pulaski, Tennessee. In 2013, Hillside was purchased by LifePoint Hospitals of Brentwood, Tennessee.

Shortly after being acquired, Hillside was rebranding along with four other rural hospitals in south central Tennessee. The new hospital group is called Southern Tennessee Regional Health System (STRHS). Southern Tennessee Regional Health System is led by CEO Phil Young from his office in Winchester, Tennessee.

In 2015, Jim Edmonson returned to Pulaski to become the CEO of the hospital. He joined Donald Gavin (CFO) and Sherry Sands (CNO). Together they lead the newly branded location.

Southern Tennessee Regional Health System provides comprehensive Health care services to an eight county region of Southern Tennessee and Northern Alabama.
