= Zucker Hillside Hospital =

Major teaching and psychiatric hospital

- Northwell Health
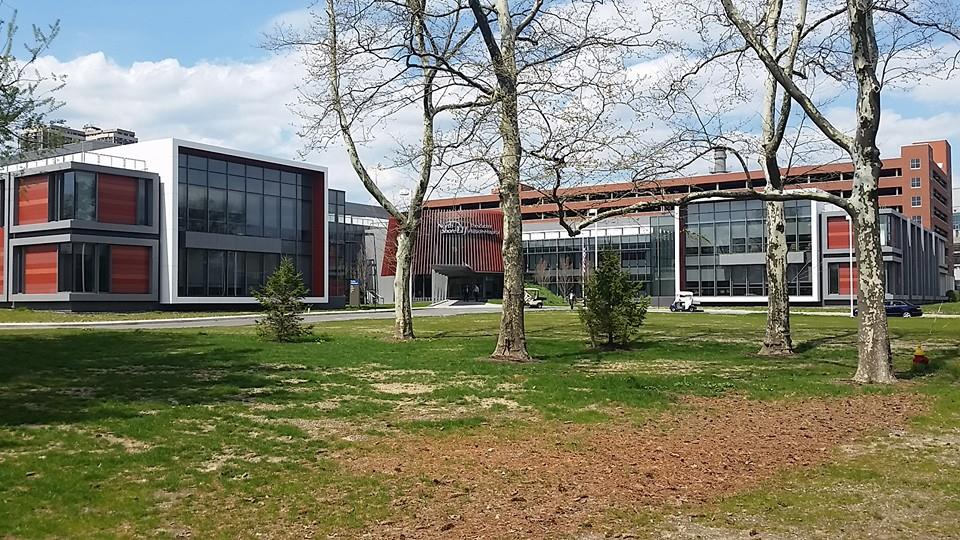

Geography
- Location: Glen Oaks, New York City, New York, United States
- Coordinates: 40.75226914026147°N 73.71022068635428°W

Organization
- Type: Specialist

Services
- Speciality: Psychiatric hospital

History
- Opened: June 1926

Links
- Lists: Hospitals in New York State
- Other links: Hospitals in Queens

Zucker Hillside Hospital is a psychiatric facility in Glen Oaks, Queens, New York. It opened in 1926, relocated to its present address in 1941, and was renamed in 1999 to its present name.

== Overview ==
Zucker Hillside Hospital is an inpatient and outpatient psychiatric hospital. In the 1940s, they were an early deployer of electroconvulsive therapy. In 1948, it reported that over half their mentally ill patients reportedly "recover[ed] or show[ed] much improvement". Zucker Hillside operates as a division of Long Island Jewish Medical Center, following a 1971 merger.

== History ==
The hospital opened as Hastings Hillside Hospital at a location in Westchester County in June 1926.

Neuro-Psychiatrist Israel Strauss was its founder, and its focus is curable mental illnesses. They relocated to Glen Oaks, Queens in 1941, having raised funds to build Hillside Hospital in 1939.

In 1948, they began construction of another building, "which will increase the capacity of the hospital from 88 to 172 beds." By the time of their 1971 merger with Long Island Jewish Medical Center they had 200 psychiatric beds, and Hillside patients were participating in a system of self-government.

== Recognition and Prevention Program ==
The Recognition and Prevention (RAP) Program is a research and specialty clinic located in the hospital. It provides education and treatment for young people and their families, and conducts research about the effects of early identification in preventing the progression of serious mental illnesses.

=== History ===
The RAP Program was founded by its director, Barbara A. Cornblatt, in 1998 and was one of the first programs in North America to investigate and treat the prodromal or pre-psychotic phases of schizophrenia and bipolar disorder. Since its inception, over 250 adolescents and young adults, ages 12–22, have participated in the RAP clinic and research program.

RAP is funded by the Robert Wood Johnson Foundation and the National Institute of Mental Health, and is part of the North American Prodromal Longitudinal Study (NAPLS), a consortium of eight prodromal programs which constitutes one of the leading investigations of the biological, behavioral and functional attributes of the psychosis prodrome worldwide.

== Wender Welfare League ==
Wender Welfare League was formed in 1934 by former patients of the hospital. In 1942 they opened "a playground and recreation center covering several acres." The League subsequently changed its name to the League for Mental Health.

== See also ==
- Northwell Health
