= Personality Disorders: Theory, Research, and Treatment =

- Discipline: Personality psychology
- Language: English
- Edited by: Joshua D. Miller, PhD

Publication details
- History: 2009-present
- Publisher: American Psychological Association (USA)
- Frequency: bimonthly, beginning in January
- Impact factor: 4.2 (2024)

Standard abbreviations
- ISO 4: Pers. Disord.: Theory Res. Treat.

Indexing
- ISSN: 1949-2715 (print); 1949-2723 (web)

Links
- Journal homepage; Online access

Personality Disorders: Theory, Research, and Treatment is a peer-reviewed academic journal published by the American Psychological Association. It was established in 2009 and covers research in personality psychology. The current editor-in-chief is Joshua D. Miller, PhD.

== Abstracting and indexing ==
The journal is abstracted and indexed in the Social Sciences Citation Index. According to the Journal Citation Reports, the journal has a 2024 impact factor of 4.2.
