= Interpersonal psychotherapy =

Attachment-focused psychotherapy

Interpersonal psychotherapy (IPT) is a brief, attachment-focused psychotherapy that centers on resolving interpersonal problems and achieving symptomatic recovery. IPT is an empirically supported treatment (EST) that follows a highly structured and time-limited approach. Interpersonal therapy is intended to be completed within 12–16 weeks. IPT is based on the principle that relationships and life events impact mood and vice versa. The treatment was developed by Gerald Klerman and Myrna Weissman in order to treat major depression in the 1970s and has since been adapted for other mental disorders. IPT is an empirically validated intervention for depressive disorders and is more effective when used in combination with psychiatric medications.

== History ==
Originally named "high contact" therapy, IPT was first developed in 1969 at Yale University as part of a study designed by Gerald Klerman, Myrna Weissman and colleagues to test the efficacy of an antidepressant with and without psychotherapy as maintenance treatment of depression. Gerald Klerman specialized in treating depression, anxiety disorders, and schizophrenia. He wanted to test whether interpersonal relationships influenced mental illness onset or duration. Studies were conducted using a primitive model of IPT. From these studies, Klerman concluded that one-on-one therapy that is designed to improve interpersonal relationships was correlated to symptom improvements.

== Foundations ==
IPT was influenced by CBT as well as psychodynamic approaches. It takes its structure from CBT in that it is time-limited and employs structured interviews and assessment tools. In general, however, IPT focuses directly on affects, or feelings, whereas CBT focuses on cognitions with strong associated affects. Unlike CBT, IPT makes no attempt to uncover distorted thoughts systematically by giving homework or other assignments, nor does it help the patient develop alternative thought patterns through prescribed practice. Rather, as evidence arises during the course of therapy, the therapist calls attention to distorted thinking in relation to significant others. The goal is to change the relationship pattern rather than associated depressive cognitions, which are acknowledged as depressive symptoms.

The content of IPT's therapy was inspired by Attachment theory and Harry Stack Sullivan's Interpersonal psychoanalysis. Social theory is also influenced in a lesser role to emphasis on qualitative impact of social support networks for recovery. Unlike psychodynamic approaches, IPT does not include a personality theory or attempt to conceptualize or treat personality but focuses on humanistic applications of interpersonal sensitivity.

- Attachment Theory, forms the basis for understanding patients' relationship difficulties, attachment schema and optimal functioning when attachment needs are met.
- Interpersonal Theory, describes the ways in which patients' maladaptive metacommunication patterns (Low to high Affiliation & Inclusion and dominant to submissive Status) lead to or evoke difficulty in their here-and-now interpersonal relationships.

The aim of IPT is to help the patient to improve interpersonal and intrapersonal communication skills within relationships and to develop social support network with realistic expectations to deal with the crises precipitated in distress and to weather 'interpersonal storms'.

== Methodology ==
Interpersonal therapy deals with current interpersonal relationships and focuses on the patient's immediate social context. The original model of interpersonal therapy consists of three distinct phases. The first phase lasts for three psychotherapy sessions maximum. In this phase, the clinician evaluates a patient's symptoms and assigns them a diagnosis. They review the patient’s current social functioning and close relationships. The clinician then evaluates how the patient’s current interpersonal influence has influenced the patient’s mood or contributed to the onset of their symptoms. Symptoms are linked to the patient’s situation, which could consist of grief, interpersonal role disputes, role transitions, or interpersonal deficits. In the second phase, the therapist selects therapeutic strategies that are specific for the patient's interpersonal relationship problems. The third phase takes from 12 to 16 weeks, and it is aimed at giving the patient support and acknowledging the progress they have made.

== Clinical applications ==
It has been demonstrated to be an effective treatment for depression and has been modified to treat other psychiatric disorders such as substance use disorders and eating disorders. It is incumbent upon the therapist in the treatment to quickly establish a therapeutic alliance with positive countertransference of warmth, empathy, affective attunement and positive regard for encouraging a positive transferential relationship, from which the patient is able to seek help from the therapist despite resistance. It is primarily used as a short-term therapy completed in 12–16 weeks, but it has also been used as a maintenance therapy for patients with recurrent depression. A shorter, 6-week therapy suited to primary care settings called Interpersonal counselling (IPC) has been derived from IPT.

Interpersonal psychotherapy has been found to be an effective treatment for the following:

- Bipolar disorder
- Bulimia nervosa
- Major depressive disorder
- Post-partum depression
- PTSD

=== Bipolar Disorder ===
Bipolar disorder is correlated with a decline in the quality of interpersonal relationships and personal fulfillment with social or leisure activities. Research on treatments for bipolar disorder conclude that patients will most likely require a combination of medication and therapy. One study that used interpersonal therapy as treatment for bipolar found that a combination of IPT, social rhythm therapy and medication improved patient functioning. However, these patients did still experience both mania and depression. A review that analyzed different therapeutic approaches and their benefits to bipolar patients concluded that IPT exhibited clinical effectiveness for subsyndromal symptoms.

=== Bulimia Nervosa ===
There is a theoretical interpersonal framework that attempts to explain the onset of symptoms for bulimia nervosa. The framework proposes that interpersonal hardships cause low self-esteem and negative affect which then lead to behaviors seen in bulimic patients. In two different trials involving bulimic patients, interpersonal therapy was not concluded to be effective at treating bulimia nervosa compared to cognitive behavioral therapy. However, researchers discovered that one year after both of these trials, there was no clinically significant difference between patients who received IPT compared to CBT.

=== Major Depressive Disorder ===
When an individual is depressed, they can experience the following symptoms: social isolation, excessive fatigue, lack of motivation, loss of joy, and more. IPT has been utilized as a therapeutic treatment for depression because of its ability to aid in restoring social relations. Typically, there are three phases of IPT for the treatment of depression. The first phase involves introductory therapy sessions with a counselor and patient in which the counselor begins to familiarize themselves with the patient’s symptoms and interpersonal conflicts. Goals are then curated in order to establish a path of healing for the patient. The second phase of IPT connects the patient’s presenting symptoms to their interpersonal conflicts. Specifically, this phase of treatment attempts to find potential causes for the patient’s low mood. The third and final phase of this treatment begins when the patient’s symptoms have stabilized. Plans are established for continuance of treatment in case the patient begins to develop depressive symptoms again.

=== Post-Traumatic Stress Disorder ===
Post-traumatic stress disorder can stem from interpersonal conflict. Traumatic events such as rape or child neglect can cause lasting effects on the patient’s ability to engage in certain relationships. Interpersonal conflicts are one of the main diagnostic symptoms for PTSD. There are many different psychotherapies that have been utilized to treat PTSD symptoms, but a single effective treatment does not yet exist. Interpersonal therapy is one of the potential effective therapies to treat depressive symptoms in PTSD patients. In clinical studies, interpersonal therapy has led to a decrease in depressive PTSD symptomatology after 16 group sessions. Group sessions follow the same three stages as individual interpersonal therapy. Depressive symptoms were also decreased in women who have experienced sexual abuse trauma after 16 individualized IPT sessions. This decrease was significant compared to individualized psychotherapy.

=== Postpartum Depression ===
Postpartum depression occurs after the delivery of an infant and mimics typical depressive symptoms, although some symptoms are different: ideas of infanticide, paranoia, and compulsive thoughts. Interpersonal therapy has been thought to be a good potential treatment for postpartum depression because it is short-term and focused on present life events and relationships. In one twelve week study using IPT, 100% of patients did not meet diagnostic criteria for postpartum depression by the end of the study. Results of a similar study also showed that 12 weekly sessions of interpersonal therapy ceased depressive episodes in postpartum mothers. A majority of other studies conducted found that the average amount of time it took for mothers to completely recover was 28.60 weeks.

=== Adolescents ===
Although originally developed as an individual therapy for adults, IPT has been modified for use with adolescents and older adults.

IPT for children is based on the premise that depression occurs in the context of an individual's relationships regardless of its origins in biology or genetics. More specifically, depression affects people's relationships and these relationships further affect our mood. The IPT model identifies four general areas in which a person may be having relationship difficulties:

1. grief after the loss of a loved one;
2. conflict in significant relationships, including a client's relationship with his or her own self;
3. difficulties adapting to changes in relationships or life circumstances; and
4. difficulties stemming from social isolation.

The IPT therapist helps identify areas in need of skill-building to improve the client's relationships and decrease the depressive symptoms. Over time, the client learns to link changes in mood to events occurring in his/her relationships, communicate feelings and expectations for the relationships, and problem-solve solutions to difficulties in the relationships.

IPT has been adapted for the treatment of depressed adolescents (IPT-A) to address developmental issues most common to teenagers such as separation from parents, development of romantic relationships, and initial experience with death of a relative or friend. IPT-A helps the adolescent identify and develop more adaptive methods for dealing with the interpersonal issues associated with the onset or maintenance of their depression. IPT-A is typically a 12- to 16-week treatment. Although the treatment involves primarily individual sessions with the teenager, parents are asked to participate in a few sessions to receive education about depression, to address any relationship difficulties that may be occurring between the adolescent and his/her parents, and to help support the adolescent's treatment.

=== Elderly ===
IPT has been used as a psychotherapy for depressed elderly, with its emphasis on addressing interpersonally relevant problems. IPT appears especially well suited to the life changes that many people experience in their later years.

Interpersonal therapy has been studied as a treatment for elderly people with depression. Older adults have been found to work effectively towards their goals in treatment due to the natural conversational style of IPT. In one particular study that assessed IPT’s efficacy in treating late-life depression, 78% of older adults experienced full remission of their depressive symptoms. However, 100% of participants who were focusing on role transitions experienced a resurgence of symptoms upon finishing IPT treatment.

There has been research conducted on using IPT as treatment for older adults who are suicidal. In these studies, IPT was administered alongside medication and additional psychiatric assistance. The results showed that IPT diminished depressive symptoms and stopped engaging in verbal statements of suicidal ideation quicker than without IPT.

== Types ==
=== Dynamic Interpersonal Therapy ===
Dynamic interpersonal therapy was developed due to the lack of modern psychodynamic approaches used as forms of brief interventions for mental health conditions. DIT lasts for sixteen sessions and has three distinct phases. This therapeutic technique focuses on the patient's internal and external interpersonal relationships. DIT explores internal relationships, which is similar to Sigmund Freud's psychodynamic theory. Internalized relationships refer to unconscious patterns that an individual may be carrying from their previous relationships into their present ones. Dynamic interpersonal therapy differs from ordinary IPT because it dives into these unconscious internalized relationships.

== Sources ==
- Sullivan, Harry Stack (1968) [1953]. Interpersonal Theory of Psychiatry. W. W. Norton & Company. ISBN 978-0-393-00138-9.
