= American Psychopathological Association =

- Logo of the APPA
- Formation: 1910
- Headquarters: New York City, United States
- Members: 250 members (estimate)
- 2015 President: Carol S. North
- Website: www.appassn.org

The American Psychopathological Association (APPA) is an organization "devoted to the scientific investigation of disordered human behavior, and its biological and psychosocial substrates." The association's primary purpose is running an annual conference on specific topics relevant to psychopathology research. Leading investigators from both the U.S. and abroad are invited to present original papers on topics chosen by the president.

== History ==
Around 1900, William James called for an "American Psychopathological Society". His call was in response to the gap he felt had occurred between normal psychology and more morbid sciences dealing with full-blown insanity. He wrote a proposal for an American Psychopathological Association, and in 1910, the American Psychopathological Association was founded. On May 2, 1910, the American Psychopathological Association was organized at the Willard Hotel in Washington, D.C. Due to the fact that both the American Neurological Association and the American Medico-Psychological Association (now the American Psychiatric Association) were holding annual meetings at the Willard, it was easy for people interested to attend. According to the historical membership lists, there were 42 founding members of APPA. The earliest list is from 1911, which reflects the original members as well as five newly elected members. The proceedings of the meeting were published in the June–July 1910 issue of The Journal of Abnormal Psychology, which was designated the official journal of the APPA.

Every year the APPA elects a president-elect, who organizes a future annual meeting and presides over the meeting as president. APPA presidents include well known psychopathology researchers, including Clarence P. Oberndorf, Lee N. Robins, and Joseph Zubin.

== Annual meeting ==
The primary mission of APPA is to sponsor an annual conference on a specific topic relevant to research in psychopathology. Unlike professional organizations of psychiatrists, psychologists or other health researchers, the APPA annual meeting is explicitly interdisciplinary. Leading investigators from the U.S. and abroad are invited to give original papers on the topic chosen by the president, in consultation with a governing body called the APPA Counsel. In recent years the meetings have been on the boundaries of psychopathology, biomarkers and personalized treatment of psychopathology, and chronic psychopathology and the long-term treatment (or neglect) of persons with chronic disorders. They meetings are traditionally in New York City in the first week of March, and is open to members and nonmembers alike.

== Membership ==
Members and fellows of APPA are nominated and elected during the annual meeting. To be elected, persons must be researchers or clinicians who have contributed to peer-review journals that specialize in psychopathology, epidemiology, services research or related academic topics. To be elected as a fellow, members must have made significant contributions to the understanding of psychopathology or related topics. Other membership types include:

- Corresponding member: This is a member who lives outside North America and has made important, original, and independent contributions to the field of psychopathology.
- Life fellow/member:This is a member who has been a member of APPA for at least 15 years and is retired from professional activities.
- Honorary member: This type of member is someone who is an internationally distinguished contributor to the field of psychopathology.

== Awards ==
The following awards are given annually to individuals who make significant contributions to the field of psychopathology:

- Hamilton Award: This award is named after Samuel W. Hamilton, who was the APPA president in 1938. It is given to the APPA president each year.
- Hoch Award: This award is named after Paul Hoch. Each year it is given to a person (not necessarily a member of APPA) who has produced significant research in the focus area of the meeting that year.
- Zubin Award: This award is named after former president Joseph Zubin, whose idea was that each APPA meeting centered around a theme. It is given each year to someone who has had a significant role in psychopathology research.
- Robins/Guze Award: This award is named after Eli Robins and Samuel B. Guze, psychiatrists who have had major impacts on psychiatry. Each year, it is given to someone conducting research early in their career who has not yet been a principal investigator or an associate professor.
