= Hervey M. Cleckley =

American psychiatrist (1903–1984)

Hervey Milton Cleckley
- Born: September 7, 1903; Augusta, Georgia, U.S.
- Died: January 28, 1984 (aged 80)
- Education: University of Georgia (BS, MD); University of Oxford (BA)
- Occupation: Psychiatrist
- Known for: Pioneer in the field of psychopathy
- Notable work: The Mask of Sanity

Hervey Milton Cleckley (September 7, 1903 – January 28, 1984) was an American psychiatrist and pioneer in the field of psychopathy. His book, The Mask of Sanity, originally published in 1941 and revised in new editions until the 1980s, provided the first clinical description of psychopathy. He defined the term somewhat more broadly than it is understood today, as referring to somebody who behaves in a destructive manner despite lacking overt signs of psychosis or neurosis; this is reflected in the term "mask of sanity", derived from Cleckley's belief that a psychopath can appear normal and even engaging, but that the "mask" conceals a mental disorder. By the time of his death, Cleckley was better remembered for a vivid case study of a female patient, published as a book in 1956 and turned into a movie, The Three Faces of Eve, in 1957. His report of the case (re)popularized the diagnosis of multiple personality disorder in America. The concept of psychopathy continues to be influential through forming parts of the diagnosis of antisocial personality disorder, the Psychopathy Checklist, and public perception.

== Life and career ==
Cleckley was born in Augusta, Georgia, in the Southeastern United States. His parents were William and Cora Cleckley. His younger sister, Connor Cleckley, was schooled for some time in England (e.g. Headington School, Oxford) and later married and widowed by Aquilla J. Dyess, the only person ever to be granted America's highest awards for both civilian and military heroism (the Carnegie medal and, posthumously after World War II, the Medal of Honor).

Cleckley graduated from the Academy of Richmond County high school in 1921, then graduated in 1924 summa cum laude with a Bachelor of Science degree in mathematics and science from the University of Georgia (UGA) in Athens, where he was a member of the varsity football and track and field teams. Cleckley won a Rhodes Scholarship to study at Oxford University, England, graduating in 1926 with a Bachelor of Arts.

Cleckley then earned his M.D. from the University of Georgia Medical School (now known as the Medical College of Georgia) in Augusta in 1929. After several years of psychiatric practice in the Veterans Administration, he became professor of psychiatry and neurology at the Medical College of Georgia and, in 1937, the chief of psychiatry and neurology at University Hospital in Augusta. In 1955, Cleckley was appointed clinical professor of psychiatry and neurology at the medical college and became founding chairman of the Department of Psychiatry and Health Behavior. He served as a psychiatric consultant to the Veterans Administration Hospital in Augusta and the US Army Hospital at Camp Gordon. He was a member of the forensic committee of the Group for the Advancement of Psychiatry and a fellow of the American Board of Psychiatry and Neurology and the Society for Biological Psychiatry. He also worked in the private practice of psychiatry along with Corbett Thigpen and later also Benjamin Moss, Jere Chambers, and Seaborn McGarity. His first wife was Louise Martin; after her death, he married Emily Sheftall.

== Psychopathy ==
In 1941, Cleckley authored his magnum opus The Mask of Sanity: An Attempt to Clarify Some Issues About the So-Called Psychopathic Personality. This became a landmark in psychiatric case studies and was repeatedly reprinted in subsequent editions. Cleckley revised and expanded the work with each edition published; the second American edition published in 1950 he described as effectively a new book (Cleckley 1988, p.vii).

The Mask of Sanity is distinguished by its central thesis, that the psychopath exhibits normal function according to standard psychiatric criteria, yet privately engages in destructive behavior. The book was intended to assist with the detection and diagnosis of the elusive psychopath for purposes of palliation and offered no cure for the condition itself. The idea of a master deceiver secretly possessed of no moral or ethical restraints, yet behaving in public with excellent function, electrified American society and led to heightened interest in both psychological introspection and the detection of hidden psychopaths in society at large, leading to a refinement of the word itself into what was perceived to be a less stigmatizing term, "sociopath".

=== Military application ===
In the same year as he published The Mask of Sanity during World War II, Cleckley wrote an address warning: "In our present efforts to prepare for national defense no problem which confronts the examining boards for selective service is more pressing or more subtle than that of the so-called psychopathic personality". He argued such soldiers were likely to fail, be disorganized, and be a drain on time and resources. He recommended routinely checking for past encounters with law enforcement or drinking alcohol until incapacitated. In The Mask of Sanity, under a subsection entitled "Not as single spies but in battalions", and further detailed in the appendix, Cleckley describes a survey he and others conducted between 1937 and 1939 at a large federal Veterans Administration (VA) hospital on the southeastern seaboard, where he worked as one of the psychiatrists for the ex-servicemen who were mainly veterans of World War I. Cleckley critiques the "benign policy" of the VA of not diagnosing more psychopathic personalities due to giving the benefit of the doubt to issues such as neurasthenia, hysteria, psychasthenia, posttraumatic neuroses, or cerebral trauma from skull injuries and concussions. He concludes that psychopathic personalities have "records of the utmost folly and misery and idleness over many years" and if considering also the number in every community who are protected by relatives, "the prevalence of this disorder is seen to be appalling."

=== Semantic theory ===
Cleckley consistently described the hypothesized central deficit in psychopathy as "semantic" (the 'meaning' of things), early on referring to it as a "semantic dementia" or "dysergasia" (a term of Adolf Meyer's, implying a physiological basis) and later "disorder". He explained that this did not refer to the meaning of life in an abstract sense but to the emotional substrate from which the purposes and loyalties of everyday life are formed and experienced. In using the term semantic in this broad psychosocial sense, he referred to Alfred Korzybski's theory of general semantics. However Cleckley also separately employed an analogy to a language disorder called "semantic aphasia" in explaining the distinction between the appearance of correct functioning on the surface despite an underlying deficit in meaning. This has repeatedly led to the belief that he had suggested the core abnormality is in the use of language, which he has said is a misinterpretation. Today the term semantic dementia refers to a specific neurodegenerative disorder involving loss of semantic memory, while semantic disorder commonly refers to semantic pragmatic disorder associated with autism.

=== Contributors ===
Cleckley states in The Mask Of Sanity that "Dr. Corbett H. Thigpen, my medical associate of many years, has played a major part in the development and the revision of this work". He also credits his and Thigpen's wives, both called "Louise", as well as the "constant encouragement, generous help, and the major inspiration that have come from Dr. Sydenstricker to the Department of Neuropsychiatry." Cleckley also mentions taking inspiration for the structure of his book from a work called The Psychology of Insanity by Bernard Hart, an English physician who also published a case study of a multiple personality.

=== Further development ===
Based on Cleckley's work, but with fundamental changes, from the 1970s the psychologist Robert D. Hare devised an influential "psychopathy checklist" to assess psychopathy primarily in the criminal justice system. The concept of psychopathy evolved substantially with the development of this checklist, and the descriptions of the 15 psychopaths discussed in The Mask of Sanity were thus recently reassessed according to more modern understandings of what psychopathy constitutes. The authors note that "the Cleckley psychopaths were often bold and fearless, as well as exploitative, charming, dishonest, self-centered, remorseless, and shallow. They exhibited a wide range of criminal behavior, albeit inadequately motivated (i.e., petty and poorly planned), consistent with their poor judgment, and inadequate life plan. They were not particularly cruel, callous, or physically aggressive, inconsistent perhaps with current and/or media presentations of the prototypic psychopath." Hence, the modern understanding of psychopathy has placed substantially more emphasis on cruelty and physical aggression, compared to what Cleckley envisioned originally.

== Vitamins ==
Virgil P. Sydenstricker was a professor of medicine and an internationally recognized specialist in hematology and nutrition. Articles published with Cleckley were among the first to describe an atypical form of pellagra (now known as "niacin deficiency") which was then endemic in southern states. In 1939 and 1941 they published on the use of nicotinic acid (niacin or vitamin B_{3}) as a treatment for abnormal mental states and psychiatric disorders. The studies have been erroneously used to justify the use of megavitamin therapy in psychiatric disorders such as schizophrenia.

== Coma shock therapy ==
Cleckley practiced the now out-dated "coma therapy", where psychiatric patients would be repeatedly put into comas over several weeks through overdoses of insulin, metrazol or other drugs. In the wake of sometimes fatal complications, Cleckley published in 1939 and 1941 advising on theoretical grounds the prophylactic administration of various vitamins, salts and hormones. In 1951, he also co-published case study research suggesting the use of electronarcosis for various conditions, a form of deep sleep therapy initiated by passing an electric current through the brain, without causing seizures as in electroconvulsive therapy which he also used.

== Criminal responsibility ==
In 1952 Cleckley, along with Walter Bromberg, a senior psychiatrist and psychoanalyst, published an article on the insanity defense. They suggested changing the wording of it to: "In your opinion, was the defendant suffering from disease of the mind and if so, was it sufficient to render him unaccountable under the law for the crime charged?" The concept of 'accountability' was intended as an alternative to a narrow definition of 'responsibility' under the M'Naghten rules which requires an absence of moral knowledge of right and wrong, in effect only covering psychosis (delusions, hallucinations). They argued that mental illness can involve any part of the mind and that the insanity test should focus on the extent to which the accused's mind overall, due to some inner pathology 'whether obvious or masked', was unable to operate in accord with the law. However, 10 years later, a chapter by Cleckley on "Psychiatry: Science, Art, and Scientism" cautioned others against a common exaggeration of the abilities of psychiatry to diagnose or treat, including in regard to criminal responsibility. In that regard Cleckley expressed his agreement with a critique by Hakeem, yet Hakeem had quoted Cleckley's claims about psychopathy as an example of psychiatrists exaggerating how clear their diagnostic terms are to each other.

Cleckley was a psychiatrist for the prosecution in the 1979 trial of serial killer Ted Bundy, the first to be televised nationally in the United States. After interviewing Bundy and reviewing two prior reports, he diagnosed him as a psychopath. At the competency hearing a defense psychiatrist also argued that Bundy was a psychopath, however, he concluded that Bundy was not competent to stand trial or represent himself, while Cleckley argued that he was competent.

== Multiple personality ==
In 1956, Cleckley co-authored a book The Three Faces of Eve with Corbett H. Thigpen, his partner in private practice and colleague at the Department of Psychiatry at Georgia University. It was based on their patient Chris Costner Sizemore who Thigpen especially had treated over several years. They published a research article on the case in 1954, documenting the sessions and how they came to view it as a case of 'multiple personalities', referencing Morton Prince's earlier controversial case study of Christine Beauchamp (pseudonym). They also discussed what is meant by 'personality' and identity, noting how it can change even in everyday senses (becoming 'a new person' or 'not himself' etc.). Such a diagnosis had fallen into relative disuse in psychiatry but Thigpen and Cleckley felt they had identified a rare case, though others have questioned the use of hypnosis and suggestion in creating some if not all of the characterization.

The book also served as the basis for a blockbuster 1957 film The Three Faces of Eve starring Joanne Woodward, in which Lee J. Cobb played the initial treating psychiatrist and Edwin Jerome the consultant. Both Thigpen and Cleckley received writing credits and reportedly over a million dollars. In the book and film 'Eve' is cured of her alternate personalities, but Sizemore states that she was not free of them until many years later. She also alleges that she was not aware the session reports would be published outside of medical circles, or that she was signing over rights to her life story forever (for $3 for the book rights to McGraw-Hill which sold 2 million copies and $5000 for the visual rights (relatives received $2000)). She fought unsuccessfully to stop the publication of videos of her treatment sessions, but in 1989 successfully sued the film studio 20th Century Fox when it wanted to make a parody remake of its film and tried to use a 1956 contract she had signed, without legal representation via Thigpen, to prevent Sissy Spacek optioning Sizemore's own published book on her life. When Sizemore returned to Augusta for a speaking tour in 1982, neither Thigpen nor Cleckley attended and she did not visit them, though in 2008 she described the diagnosis and treatment of her as courageous. In 1984 Thigpen and Cleckley published a brief communication in an international hypnosis journal cautioning against over-use of the diagnosis of multiple personality disorder.

== Pathological sexuality ==
Cleckley also authored the 1957 book The Caricature of Love: A Discussion of Social, Psychiatric, and Literary Manifestations of Pathologic Sexuality. Shortly after it was described by one medical reviewer as "a diatribe against homosexual influences in our culture and the Freudian doctrines that he believes support these influences."

== See also ==
- Psychopathy
- Sociopath
- The Mask of Sanity
