= The Mask of Sanity =

Nonfiction psychopathy book by Hervey Cleckley

- The Mask of Sanity, 1982 edition
- Author: Hervey M. Cleckley
- Language: English
- Subject: Psychopathy, mental disorders
- Publisher: Mosby
- Publication date: 1941
- Publication place: United States
- Media type: Print

The Mask of Sanity: An Attempt to Clarify Some Issues About the So-Called Psychopathic Personality is a book written by American psychiatrist Hervey M. Cleckley, first published in 1941, describing Cleckley's clinical interviews with patients in a locked institution. The text is considered a seminal work and the most influential clinical description of psychopathy in the twentieth century. The basic elements of psychopathy outlined by Cleckley have influenced later discussion and diagnosis.

The title refers to the normal "mask" that conceals the mental disorder of the psychopathic person in Cleckley's conceptualization.

Cleckley describes the psychopathic person as outwardly a perfect mimic of a normally functioning person, able to mask or disguise the fundamental lack of internal personality structure, an internal chaos that results in repeatedly purposeful destructive behavior, often more self-destructive than destructive to others. Despite the seemingly sincere, intelligent, even charming external presentation, internally the psychopathic person does not have the ability to experience genuine emotions. Cleckley questions whether this mask of sanity is voluntarily assumed to intentionally hide the lack of internal structure, but concludes it hides a serious, yet imprecisely unidentified, semantic neuropsychiatric defect. Six editions of the book were produced in total, the final shortly after his death. An expanded fifth edition of the book had been published in 1976 and was re-released by his heirs in 1988 for non-profit educational use.

== History ==
In the 1800s, Philippe Pinel first used the French term manie sans delire ("mania without delirium") to designate those individuals engaging in deviant behavior but exhibiting no signs of a cognitive disorder such as hallucinations or delusions. Although the meaning of the term has changed through numerous writings on the subject over time, the writing of Cleckley and his use of the label "psychopath" in The Mask of Sanity brought the term into popular usage.

== Editions ==
The first edition was published in 1941, with the subtitle then being 'An attempt to re-interpret' rather than as later 'to clarify'. Cleckley says in the preface that the book "grew out of an old conviction which increased during several years while I sat at staff meetings in a large neuropsychiatric hospital". He added that after commencing full-time teaching duties he found similar patients to be as prevalent in a general hospital, outpatient clinic and the community. In later editions he explains that the basic concepts presented in 1941 were based primarily on "adult male psychopaths hospitalized in a closed institution" for several years. Cleckley had worked for a number of years at a United States Veterans (military) Administration hospital, before taking up full-time teaching responsibilities at the University of Georgia School of Medicine.

The second edition published in 1950, Cleckley has described as a "new and much larger book", based on more diverse clinical observations, feedback and literature reviews. The third edition in 1955 he describes as having fewer changes and additions, but important clarifications to key concepts such as the hypothesis of a core semantic deficit. A fourth edition was published in 1964.

A fifth edition was published in 1976 (ISBN 0801609852) and is generally considered to be the definitive culmination of Cleckley's work. The preface does not specify the changes made. Unlike the first edition it states: "Dr. Corbett H. Thigpen, my medical associate of many years, has played a major part in the development and the revision of this work." Cleckley also states that it could not have been written without the assistance and contributions of Thigpen's wife and his own (first), both called Louise. A sixth edition was published shortly after Cleckley's death in 1984, but is described by others as having minimal substantive changes. Several further years after Cleckley's death, another fifth edition (ISBN 0962151904) was released for non-profit educational use by Emily S. Cleckley, his second wife, naming her as well as Hervey M. Cleckley and copyrighted 1988 to her rather than Mosby as for all prior initial releases (which have been repeat published in various different years).

== Description ==
The Mask of Sanity, fifth edition, presents clinical theories as well as case studies, written in the form of dramatic, novelistic descriptions of 13 individuals, an amalgamation of those he had observed.

=== Initial outline ===
The Mask of Sanity begins in Section One, "An Outline of the Problem", by considering the concept of sanity, which Cleckley describes as protean. The first words of the book are a possibly untrue anecdote ending with the line, capitalized and centered in large font, "WHO'S LOONEY NOW?" Cleckley suggests that everyone "behaves at times with something short of complete rationality and good judgment". He notes that many types of people hold beliefs that he and much of society would consider irrational, such as mysticism, pseudoscience, praising of unintelligible or immoral works (e.g. acclaim for the novel Finnegans Wake containing only "erudite gibberish" or for the writing of André Gide on pederasty), and religious faith. He argues, however, that these are personal freedoms and such groups are usually capable of leading useful lives in harmony with others. This he says distinguishes it from psychosis once fully developed and from psychopathy.

==== Classification schemes ====
Cleckley also addresses the confusing traditions of classification in the area of psychopathy, a term he admits is itself confusing and not being used in line with its etymological meaning ('mental sickness'), though adopts it as the most familiar and apparently durable. He considers the terms sociopathic personality and antisocial personality, as adopted by the Diagnostic and Statistical Manual of Mental Disorders; the relationship to the overall category of personality disorder; and the earlier widespread concept of "constitutional psychopathic inferiority", disputing its hereditary assumptions. He states that the main purpose of the book is to bring a few cases before other psychiatrists, and also to raise the profile among the public, to enable better management of psychopaths. He criticizes the 'doctrine of permissiveness', and refers with regret to the lack of prominence of psychopathy in psychiatric textbooks.

==== Prevalence ====
Cleckley argues under a subsection titled "Not as single spies but in battalions" (a phrase appearing in Hamlet), that although reliable statistics are hard to come by, there are various reasons to suspect both psychiatric and prison admission rates are an underestimate, and the incidence of the condition is in his opinion "exceedingly high". He does present some statistics from a survey whereby he and nine other psychiatrists diagnosed 1/8th of patients as having psychopathic personality without any other mental disorder that might explain the condition, and considers that quite a few others classified as alcoholic or drug addicted would actually have qualified too. Their survey is further detailed in the book's appendix, where Cleckley clarifies it took place between 1937 and 1939 at a federal Veterans Administration hospital, located on the Southeastern seaboard, for the care of ex-service men, mainly from World War I. He critiques the 'benign policy' of the VA of not diagnosing more psychopathic personality due to giving the benefit of the doubt to issues such as neurasthenia, hysteria, psychasthenia, posttraumatic neuroses, or cerebral trauma from skull injuries and concussions. He concludes they have "records of the utmost folly and misery and idleness over many years" and if considering the number in every community who are protected by relatives, "the prevalence of this disorder is seen to be appalling."

==== Method ====
Finally, Cleckley asserts that the account provided in his book will accord with the scientific method, as pointed out by Karl Pearson in The Grammar of Science, which he loosely summarizes as: to record observed facts; group them together by correlation as distinguished from other facts; to try to summarize or explain in a way that indicates the significance. He also says his method takes inspiration from that used in an earlier work, The Psychology of Insanity, by English physician Bernard Hart (first edition published in 1912 and now open access).

=== Characteristics ===
In Section Two, "The Material", Cleckley presents a typical "full" psychopath's behavior in a series of vignettes: originally nine in the first edition, and all male, but later editions expanded to 15 and included women.

For example, the psychopath can typically tell vivid, lifelike, plausible stories that are completely fraudulent, without evincing any element of delusion. When confronted with a lie, the psychopath is unflappable and can often effortlessly pass it off as a joke. In another typical case history, the psychopath is hospitalized for psychiatric treatment but because of his constant trouble-making, leaving wards in an uproar, the hospital is finally forced to turn him over to the police. Eventually, the police become so sick of his repeated antics that they try to hospitalize him again.

Also included are six vignettes of "Incomplete manifestations or suggestions of the disorder" in non-patients, such as "The businessman", "The gentleman" or "The physician".

=== Differentiation ===
In Section Three, 'Cataloging the material', Cleckley continues the conceptual outline started in Section One, now termed 'Orientation'. He criticises the tenets of faculty psychology (now known as modularity of mind), arguing that such things as intelligence, morality and emotions are not separate parts in the brain but separate concepts we apply. He believes psychopaths would have been included in the 19th century concepts of 'mania without insanity' by Philippe Pinel and Prichard's moral insanity, but rejects their faculty basis. He notes the confusingly broad literal meaning and practical usage of the terms psychopathic personality or personality disorder, giving the example of the most authoritative textbook of the second quarter of the century, Psychopathic Personalities, by German psychiatrist Eugen Kahn.

He rails against the counterculture antihero and gives as an example the novelist Alan Harrington for suggesting a socially necessary role for psychopathy in modern times, calling the idea "perverse and degenerate". He also criticizes Freudian-inspired ideas about antisocial acts being caused by unconscious guilt. He also disagrees with theories of neurotic, emotional or paranoid problems in subtypes of psychopathy, as in his concept there is always a relative or complete lack of this. He says the new DSM "personality disorder, antisocial type" offers an accurate term equivalent to psychopathy which he thinks will also continue as a term for a long time.

==== Psychosis ====
Cleckley then considers how schizophrenia is different from psychopathy, having a defect in theoretical reasoning. He notes that schizoid disorders may appear more similar, and might be more accurately called "masked schizophrenia", which he notes can sometimes be difficult to differentiate from psychopathy. He also notes other 'disguises' of severe personality disorder, such as "cryptic depression" or "pseudoneurotic schizophrenia" or "pseudopsychopathic schizophrenia". He finds the diagnosis of "psychosis with psychopathic personality" unnecessarily confusing. He declares, "There is little point in devoting space to detailed accounts of paranoid or cyclothymic personalities."

In the first edition Cleckley described his psychopathic patients as "frankly and unquestionably psychotic", but modified this in later editions. In the fifth edition he describes long ago changing his opinion and now agreeing with the psychiatrist Richard L. Jenkins that this would stretch the definition of psychosis too far. However at various other points it is still suggested that, despite "traditional" classification, the extent of the inner abnormality and associated dysfunction in psychopathy is such that it might be considered a psychosis in many respects.

==== Criminality ====
Cleckley draws important distinctions between the psychopath and non-psychopathic criminal. He states that the psychopath very seldom takes much advantage of any gain, has an obscure or inconsistent purpose, usually puts himself unnecessarily in a shameful position as much as causing trouble for others; and usually does not commit the most serious or violent crimes, but usually does end up harming himself. However, despite the general picture of weak-willed and inconsistent antisocial behavior, he also states, at least in later editions, that some may develop drives towards the most serious or sadistic crimes. He suggests this is a somewhat separate additional pathology but does not explain why or how.

Cleckely considers that the concept of delinquency has much in common with his concept of psychopathy, and argues that it could be considered a mild version of psychopathy if it continues for a long time and is generalized. He notes that many respectable mature productive citizens can look back on short periods of unprovoked social misconduct, including such things as property damage, racism, bestiality, voyeurism, rebellion, and promiscuity. On the other hand, he notes prolonged but prescribed behavioral disorder in the case of a woman who remained for some time "irrationally promiscuous and bisexual", but who had plausible psychological reasons for her behavior and was otherwise functional in her work and life. He also notes he no longer considers that homosexuality should be classed as sexual psychopathy, on the grounds that many homosexuals seem to be able to live productive lives in society. He considers that sexual fetishes are not particularly consistent with psychopaths, as the latter tend to have weak drives. He then states that psychopathy can be associated with particular sadistic drives and often be responsible for the most serious sex crimes.

==== Other conditions ====
He distinguishes psychopaths from non-psychopathic alcoholics, who by contrast have a purpose for drinking such as to avoid reality, and may want and try to change, whereas the psychopath appears to drink simply to behave outrageously and get into trouble. He also separates psychoneurotics (though accepts there may sometimes be overlap) and "mental defectives" (who unlike the psychopath will test poorly on theoretical intelligence tests as well as in behavior in life). The psychopath does not suffer from any obvious mental disorder but in the end seems to deliberately court failure and disaster for no obvious reason and despite intelligence, in what Cleckley calls a social and spiritual suicide.

Cleckley then considers whether psychopathy may be erratic genius. In surveying some noted literary works embodying what he describes as "malignantly perverse attitudes", such as by Paul Verlaine, Dostoevski, Marquis de Sade, Baudelaire and Swinburne (some associated with the Decadent movement), he suggests that it might be a form of psychopathy, and might appeal to similarly disordered people or to "new cults of intellectual defeatists and deviates" such as certain avant garde groups. However he concludes that such artworks and sexual deviations are more likely due to schizoid disorder with misanthropy and life perversion, whereas the "true psychopath" would not labor to produce art extolling pathologic or perverse attitudes; on the contrary, they would tend to superficially proclaim belief in a normal, moral life. However, Cleckley then suggests that initial potential for greatness and emotional depth may cause problems, such as being more affected by problems in life, that then leads into psychopathy.

==== Fiction and ancient history ====
Cleckley then surveys numerous characters in fictional works that he considers to be portrayals of psychopathy. He concludes by addressing figures in history, excluding Adolf Hitler and others from his definition but highlighting Alcibiades, a military general and politician in Ancient Greece. He describes a fascination with him growing out an old conviction in the "paradoxical" nature of his life, since learning of it in high school. He concludes that Alcibiades "had the gift of every talent except that of using them consistently to achieve any sensible aim or in behalf of any discernible cause" and he "may have been a spectacular example of...the psychopath", that "still inexplicable pattern of human life".

=== Profile ===
Cleckley then summarizes the material and provides a 'clinical profile', describing 16 behavioral characteristics of a psychopath (reduced from 21 in the first edition):

1. Superficial charm and good intelligence
2. Absence of delusions and other signs of irrational thinking
3. Absence of nervousness or psychoneurotic manifestations
4. Unreliability
5. Untruthfulness and insincerity
6. Lack of remorse and shame
7. Inadequately motivated antisocial behavior
8. Poor judgment and failure to learn by experience
9. Pathologic egocentricity and incapacity for love
10. General poverty in major affective reactions
11. Specific loss of insight
12. Unresponsiveness in general interpersonal relations
13. Fantastic and uninviting behavior with drink and sometimes without
14. Suicide threats rarely carried out
15. Sex life impersonal, trivial, and poorly integrated
16. Failure to follow any life plan.

Some of the criteria have obvious psychodynamic implications, such as a lack of remorse, poor judgment, failure to learn from experience, pathological egocentricity, lack of capacity for love, a general poverty in major affective reactions, and lack of insight into his own condition. Starting in 1972, newer editions of the book reflected a closer alliance with Kernberg's (1984) borderline level of personality organization, specifically defining the structural criteria of the psychopath's identity integration, defensive operations and reality testing.

=== Pathology and causes ===
In Section Four, "Some Questions Still Without Answers", Cleckley discusses his concept of "semantic" dementia (used today to refer to a medical disorder unconnected to Cleckley's meaning) or, in later editions, semantic disorder or deficit. He referred to a hypothesized neurological condition which would be the underlying pathology linking together and explaining all the different personalities classed as psychopathy by Cleckley. By semantic he meant the ability to emotionally experience or understand "the meaning of life as lived by ordinary people". He acknowledged there was no proof or even evidence that this was the underlying condition, but believed that it helped explain the traits and behaviors he observed. As an example to explain the kind of distinction he was drawing between an ability to appear superficially normal despite a core deficit in meaning, he made an analogy to a neurological language disorder known as semantic aphasia.

Cleckley concludes from his clinical experience that the cause of the disorder of psychopathy is probably not, in general, demonstrably psychodynamic or even psychogenic, although life influences may play a role in some cases and he notes the progression of the disorder can seem like a kind of social and spiritual (but not actual) suicide, or "semi-suicide". He suggests rather that a subtle yet profound defect at a fundamental biological level, probably inborn in some sense but not hereditary (gives the example of agenesis of the embryo) could be the main cause. He admits "This, too, is still a speculative concept and is not supported by demonstrable evidence." Having called it a defect, he notes that it would be "one that affects complex mechanisms of integration in a subtle and abstruse manner", and as such could actually sometimes be a positive trait or ability which could nevertheless end up bringing about personal problems in society.

=== Treatment or control ===
Cleckley writes in the fifth edition that he remains, since before the first edition, profoundly struck both by the lack of response to treatment of those he classes as psychopathic, and by the legal difficulty of trying to detain them in hospital. While noting the issue of the protection of liberty, he argues that better ways must be found to do the latter for their own good and that of society, on the primary basis of demonstrated disability and need, perhaps within psychiatric units but segregated from other patients. He notes that neither psychological therapy or physical methods such as shock therapy or lobotomy appear to be a real solution to the problem, but suggests that more opportunity to control and direct the person may help psychiatrists treat them in the long-run. He also considers the issue of competency hearings and the insanity defense when crimes are committed. He expresses concern that his prior equating of psychopathy with psychosis was not intended to imply that psychopaths should be automatically found not guilty. However he also expresses dissatisfaction with sending psychopaths to prison which he believes will inevitably fail to correct the behaviour due to the underlying abnormality or masked 'insanity'.

== Reception and legacy ==
Cleckley's work is often considered a seminal contribution to the psychiatric definition of psychopathy, and continues to act as a cornerstone to subsequent lines of research and clinical practice. The label "psychopath" as used by Cleckley has also been embraced by popular culture, and is often applied to serial killers and other violent criminals, irrespective of whether they qualify; for this reason the imprecise popular use had been deplored. Therefore, although in popular culture the term is common, that usage has little technical relevance to criminology, forensic psychology or psychiatry.

However, Robert D. Hare, a psychologist working in criminology, developed an influential Psychopathy Checklist based on the psychopath construct developed by Cleckley. Later two items were removed from the checklist in order to more clearly represent the structure of a two-factor analysis. Grandiosity, impulsivity and juvenile delinquency were not in Cleckley's criteria but were put into Hare's, who left out Cleckley's core criteria of no significant irrational thinking or anxiety. Hare has written that The Mask of Sanity has such detailed and complex descriptions and speculations that it can support a variety of different interpretations. He suggests it is necessary to interpret it with supporting evidence, though notes that it has virtually no empirical data to enable this.

There has been continued disagreement about the extent to which Cleckley's concept of psychopathy is antisocial or criminal. Some point out that the core personality was not described by Cleckley as usually particularly hostile or aggressive, unlike in Hare's later concept. Others point out that persistent antisocial behavior was considered characteristic, and "Without exception, all the individuals represented in his case histories engage in repeated violations of the law—including truancy, vandalism, theft, fraud, forgery, fire-setting, drunkenness and disorderly conduct, assault, reckless driving, drug offences, prostitution, and escape."

Some researchers have concluded from a convergence of findings that Cleckley's concept is probably not a distinct clinical entity, although may represent one important dimension of personality disorder, and has failed to clarify the field in the way he hoped. Criticisms include that his work was scientifically limited, biased by social value judgments, that there has been a failure to distinguish the hypothesized emotional deficit from that associated with other disorders and to evidence its hypothesized semantic nature or neurological basis, or to put it in the context of any theory of motivation.

One early psychoanalytic reviewer described the Cleckley's viewpoint as presenting a paradox, in that his "keen clinical observations" were not integrated into a meaningful psychological model. Cleckley questions the usefulness of psychoanalytic approaches, while at the same time he uses some psychoanalytic explanatory concepts. The rich clinical detail is not developed into a systematic psychological theory.

Perri and Lichtenwald have argued that Cleckley was blinded by cultural myths about male aggression and female innocence, and thus tended to overlook or minimize psychopathic behaviors in women.

The committee for the 1980 DSM-III, in attempting to develop a basis for the antisocial personality disorder diagnosis, had made efforts to combine the work of Lee Robins's 1966 criteria (actually from Eli Robins) of behavioral acts, with trait-oriented items based on the work of Cleckley. The compromise was to list the behaviors as the actual diagnostic criteria, but cover Cleckley's core traits in the "associated features" text description. Somewhat paradoxically, Cleckley regarded the DSM category as equivalent to his concept of psychopathy, while Hare considers his concept, which was based on Cleckley's, to be different from the DSM since the third version and to be more similar to the ICD's continuing category of "Dissocial Personality Disorder". In the DSM-V this is now a "psychopathy specifier", for antisocially disordered persons who are particularly lacking in anxiety and who have a bold style.

== See also ==
- American Psycho
- One Flew Over the Cuckoo's Nest
- Snakes in Suits: When Psychopaths Go to Work
- The Mind of Adolf Hitler
