= Corbett H. Thigpen =

American physician (1919–1999)

Corbett H. Thigpen (January 8, 1919 – March 19, 1999) was an American psychiatrist and co-author of the book The Three Faces of Eve (1957).

== Education and career ==
Thigpen attended North Georgia College (now University of North Georgia) and Mercer University. He graduated from the Medical College of Georgia (MCG) in Augusta in 1945.

Thigpen then entered into the private practice of psychiatry with Dr. Hervey M. Cleckley. Together, for much of the 1940s and most of the 1950s, they comprised the Departments of Psychiatry and Neurology at MCG, being then and there the only teachers in those fields, while also maintaining their private practice. Treatments they used included coma therapy, electroshock therapy (ECT), deep sleep therapy and lobotomy. Cleckley later wrote in The Mask of Sanity that "Thigpen, my medical associate of many years, has played a major part in the development and the revision of this work".

== Multiple personality ==
In 1957, with Cleckley, Thigpen co-authored the book The Three Faces of Eve, the first popular account of a case of multiple personalities (now called dissociative identity disorder). They had previously published a research article on their patient "Eve" in 1954, documenting the psychiatric sessions and how they came to view it as a case of multiple personality. Such a diagnosis had fallen into relative disuse in psychiatry, but Thigpen and Cleckley felt they had identified a rare case. Others have questioned the use of hypnosis and suggestion in creating some if not all of the characterization.

The book was made into a film, The Three Faces of Eve, released later in 1957, and starring Joanne Woodward, who earned an Academy Award for Best Actress for her role, and Lee J. Cobb as her psychiatrist, called Dr. Curtis Luther. Thigpen and Cleckley served as advisors to Director Nunnally Johnson and received writing credits on the film. At the authors' behest, the film followed the actual patient's life and treatment.

In the book and film, Eve is cured of her alternate personalities, but the real life person, Chris Costner Sizemore, has stated that she was not free of them until many years later. She also alleges that she was not aware that the session reports would be published outside of medical circles, or that she was signing over rights to her life story forever. Specifically, she received £3 for the book rights to McGraw-Hill which sold 2 million copies and $5000 for the visual rights, while relatives received $2000. She fought unsuccessfully to stop the publication of videos of her treatment sessions, but in 1989 she successfully sued the film studio 20th Century Fox when it wanted to make a parody remake of its film and tried to use a 1956 contract she had signed, without legal representation via Thigpen, to prevent Sissy Spacek optioning Sizemore's own published book on her life. When Sizemore returned to Augusta for a speaking tour in 1982 neither Thigpen or Cleckley attended and she did not visit them, though in 2008 she described the diagnosis and treatment of her as courageous. In 1994 Thigpen and Cleckley published a brief communication in an international hypnosis journal cautioning against over-use of the diagnosis of Multiple Personality Disorder.

== Politics ==
During the mid-1960s, Thigpen stated his opposition to the policy direction of the Vietnam War, believing that it was not being fought to win, and vehemently disagreed with increasing the role of government in citizens' lives, particularly in the medical field, a trend he predicted would result in a decrease in the general quality of healthcare. To express these ideas, Thigpen wrote the speech "A Psychiatrist Looks At His Nation" and presented it throughout Georgia and South Carolina. In 1968 he was awarded the Freedom Foundation's George Washington Medal.

== Later life and career ==
Thigpen continued his practice of psychiatry until 1987, when vertigo forced retirement.

== Bibliography ==
Book:

- Thigpen, Corbett H.; Cleckley, Hervey M. (1992). The Three Faces of Eve (Revised ed.). New York City: McGraw-Hill Education. ISBN 978-0911238518. [Translated into 27 languages]

Journal Articles:

Thigpen, C. H. and Cleckley, H. M., "A Case of Multiple Personality," The Journal of Abnormal and Social Psychology, 495: 135–151, January, 1954. [Also presented at American Psychiatric Association(APA) Convention, May, 1953]

Cleckley, H. M. and Thigpen, C. H.: "The Dynamics of Illusion," American Journal of Psychiatry, 112: 334–342, November, 1955. [Presented at APA Convention, May, 1955]

Thigpen, F. B., Thigpen, C. H., and Cleckley, H. M., The Use of Electric-Convulsive Therapy in Morphine, Meperidine and Related Alkaloid Additions, The American Journal of Psychiatry, 109: 895–898, June, 1953.

Thigpen, C. H. and Moss, B. F., Jr., "Unusual Paranoid Manifestations in a Case of Psychomotor Epilepsy and Narcolepsy," Journal of Nervous and Mental Disease, 122: 381–385, October, 1955. [Presented at Georgia Medical Association Meeting, May, 1955]

Thigpen, C. H. and Cleckley, H. M., "Freudian Psychodynamics--Science or Mirage?" The New Physician (Journal of the Student American Medical Association),10: 97–101, April, 1961.

Thigpen, C. H., "Renaissance Man," Journal of the Medical Association of Georgia, 20–22, January, 1985.

Thigpen, C. H. and Cleckley, H. M.: A Case Study of Multiple Personality, 1954, Pennsylvania State University, Psychological Cinema Registry, University Park, PA.

Thigpen C. H. and Cleckley, H. M.: A Modern Properly Administered Electroconvulsive Treatment, 1979. (Presented at the APA Convention, San Francisco, CA, May, 1980.
