= The Three Faces of Eve =

1957 film by Nunnally Johnson

- Theatrical release poster
- Directed by: Nunnally Johnson
- Screenplay by: Nunnally Johnson
- Based on: The Three Faces of Eve: A Case of Multiple Personality by Corbett H. Thigpen; Hervey M. Cleckley
- Produced by: Nunnally Johnson
- Starring: Joanne Woodward; David Wayne; Lee J. Cobb
- Narrated by: Alistair Cooke
- Cinematography: Stanley Cortez
- Edited by: Marjorie Fowler
- Music by: Robert Emmett Dolan
- Distributed by: 20th Century Fox
- Release dates: September 18, 1957 (Augusta, Georgia)
- Running time: 91 minutes
- Country: United States
- Language: English
- Budget: $965,000
- Box office: $1.4 million (US rentals)

The Three Faces of Eve is a 1957 American drama film presented in CinemaScope, based on the book of the same name about the life of Chris Costner Sizemore, which was written by psychiatrists Corbett H. Thigpen and Hervey M. Cleckley, who also helped write the screenplay. Sizemore, referred to by Thigpen and Cleckley as Eve White, was a woman they suggested might have dissociative identity disorder (then known as multiple personality disorder). Sizemore's identity was concealed in interviews about this film and was not revealed to the public until 1977. The film was directed by Nunnally Johnson.

Joanne Woodward won the Academy Award for Best Actress, making her the first actress to win an Oscar for portraying three personalities (Eve White, Eve Black, and Jane). The Three Faces of Eve also became the first film since 1936—when Bette Davis won for Dangerous (1935)—to win the Best Actress award without getting nominated in any other category.

== Plot ==
In 1951, Eve White is a timid, self-effacing wife and mother who has severe and blinding headaches and occasional blackouts. Eve eventually goes to see psychiatrist Dr. Luther, and while having a conversation, a "new personality", the wild, fun-loving Eve Black, emerges. Eve Black knows everything about Eve White, but Eve White is unaware of Eve Black.

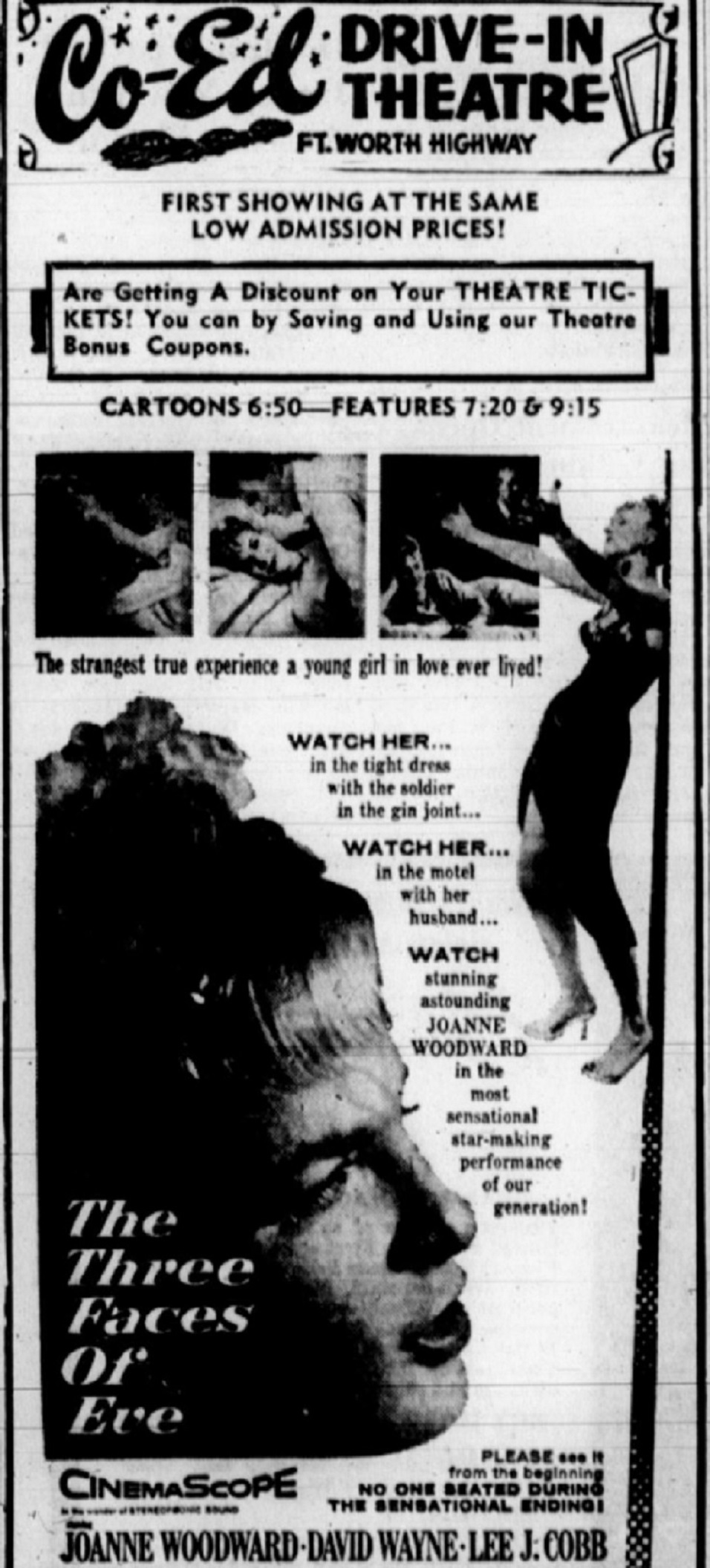
Drive-in advertisement from 1958

Eve White is sent to a hospital for observation after Eve Black is found strangling Eve White's daughter, Bonnie. After treatment in hospital, Dr. Luther decides to tell Eve W about Eve B, and then tries to explain the condition to Ralph. Dr. Luther also tells Eve B that she must behave herself, pointing out that if she tips Eve W over the edge, she will end up being locked up permanently with her. When Eve W is released, her husband Ralph finds a job in another state and leaves her in a boarding house, so that she can have further, regular treatment for a time, while Bonnie stays with Eve's parents. When Ralph returns, he tells her that he doesn't believe she has multiple personalities and tries to take her to Jacksonville, Florida, with him but she feels she isn't well enough to leave, and, afraid Eve Black will try to harm Bonnie again, refuses to go. Eve Black confronts Ralph at his motel, where he realizes Eve Black is real, but allows her to convince him to take her to Jacksonville. When Eve Black goes out dancing with another man, Ralph slaps her when she returns and ends up divorcing Eve White.

Dr. Luther considers both Eve White and Eve Black to be incomplete and inadequate personalities. The film depicts Dr. Luther's attempts to understand and deal with these two faces of Eve. Under hypnosis at one session, a third personality emerges, a relatively stable woman but with no name and little memory of her past. She chooses to take the name Jane. Dr. Luther eventually prompts her to remember a traumatic event in Eve's childhood. Her grandmother had died when she was six, and according to family custom, relatives were supposed to kiss the dead person at the viewing, making it easier for them to let go. While Eve screams, her mother forces her to kiss the corpse. Apparently, Eve's terror led to the creation of different personalities.

After discovering the trauma, Jane remembers her entire past. When Dr. Luther asks to speak with Eve White and Eve Black, Jane says they are gone. Jane marries a man named Earl whom she met when she was Jane and reunites with her daughter Bonnie.

== Cast ==
- Joanne Woodward as Eve White/Eve Black/Jane
  - Mimi Gibson as Eve - Age 8
- David Wayne as Ralph White
- Lee J. Cobb as Doctor Curtis Luther
- Edwin Jerome as Doctor Francis Day
- Alena Murray as Secretary
- Nancy Kulp as Mrs. Black
- Douglas Spencer as Mr. Black
- Terry Ann Ross as Bonnie White
- Ken Scott as Earl
- Alistair Cooke as the narrator of the film

== Original book ==
The book by Thigpen and Cleckley was rushed into publication, and the film rights were immediately sold to director Nunnally Johnson in 1957, apparently to capitalize on public interest in multiple personalities following the publication of Shirley Jackson's 1954 novel The Bird's Nest, which was also made into a film in 1957 titled Lizzie.

=== The real Eve ===
Chris Costner Sizemore has written at some length about her experiences as the real "Eve". In her 1958 book The Final Face of Eve, she used the pseudonym Evelyn Lancaster. In her 1977 book I'm Eve, she revealed her true identity. She also wrote a follow-up book, A Mind of My Own (1989).

== Reception ==
Critics uniformly praised Joanne Woodward's performance, but opinions of other aspects of the film were more mixed. Bosley Crowther of The New York Times wrote that Woodward played her part "with superlative flexibility and emotional power", but that "when you come right down to it, this is simply a melodramatic exercise—an exhibition of psychiatric hocus-pocus, without any indication of how or why. It makes for a fairly fetching mystery, although it is too verbose and too long." Variety wrote that the film was "frequently an intriguing and provocative motion picture" and that Woodward "fulfills her assignment excellently", but believed that the comedy elements "will undoubtedly confuse many viewers who won't quite be sure what emotions are suitable". Harrison's Reports called the film "a fascinating adult drama" and said that Woodward's performance was "of Academy Award caliber". John McCarten of The New Yorker wrote that Woodward "does well in a role that is inevitably full of confusion", but the film "seems rather fantastic when it depicts the heroine going through her mental gyrations at top speed". The Monthly Film Bulletin agreed, writing that Woodward "manages the triple role cleverly", but found that the depiction of psychiatric treatment "all looks a good deal too easy, and in spite of Alistair Cooke's introductory assurances of authenticity one is always conscious of being given the case history in capsule form".

The film holds a score of 94% on the review-aggregation website Rotten Tomatoes based on 16 reviews.

== Accolades ==
Award	Category	Nominee	Result	Ref.
Academy Awards	Best Actress	Joanne Woodward	Won	
British Academy Film Awards	Best Foreign Actress	Joanne Woodward	Nominated	
Golden Globe Awards	Best Actress in a Motion Picture – Drama	Joanne Woodward	Won	
National Board of Review Awards	Best Actress	Joanne Woodward	Won	

Joanne Woodward won the Academy Award for Best Actress, and later went on to play Dr. Cornelia Wilbur in the film Sybil (1976), which was a reversal of roles for Woodward. In Sybil, she played the psychiatrist who diagnosed Sybil Dorsett (played by Sally Field, who subsequently won an Primetime Emmy Award for her portrayal) with multiple personality disorder and subsequently led her through treatment.

== See also ==
- List of mental disorders in film
- Chris Costner Sizemore, the real-life woman on whom Eve is based.
