= First Person Plural =

1999 psychology-related autobiography by Cameron West

First Person Plural: My Life as a Multiple
- Author: Cameron West
- Cover artist: Rebecca Lown
- Language: English
- Genre: Nonfiction
- Publisher: Hyperion
- Publication date: 1999
- Publication place: United States
- Media type: Print (hardcover)
- Pages: 319 (first edition, hardback)
- ISBN: 0-7868-6390-0 (first edition, hardback)
- Dewey Decimal: 616.85/236/0092 B 21
- LC Class: RC569.5.M8 W44 1999

First Person Plural: My Life As A Multiple is a psychology-related autobiography written by Cameron West, who developed dissociative identity disorder (DID) as a result of childhood sexual abuse. In it, West describes his diagnosis, treatment, and personal experiences.

== Summary ==
West recovers memories of early childhood sexual abuse and is diagnosed with DID as an adult. The book chronicles the first few years of his struggle to accept and heal from his disorder.

West describes a system of 24 different personalities that emerge one by one. The presence of personalities is tied to flashbacks West experiences in which he is molested by his mother and grandmother as well as one or more unidentified male perpetrators. Alters emerge who either hold memories of West's abuse, carry the pain of the experience, or protect West's psyche in one way or another. One personality, named Switch, physically injures West's body in an effort to release pain. Unlike the classic "Sybil" (Shirley Ardell Mason), West experiences co-consciousness and doesn't have fugue states.

Throughout his long journey to acceptance, West undergoes intensive therapy, and through hospitalizations in DID-centered programs, meets many people who share his condition. His wife Rikki's constant support as well as his love for her and his son motivate West to accept his abuse and begin to heal from the damage it did to his psyche. One chapter, written entirely from Rikki's point of view, depicts her attempts to understand.

In the final pages, West allows himself to be videotaped as his alters emerge and speak. After viewing this tape, West begins to fully realize and accept the exact nature of his condition and his denial begins to abate. West pursues the study of psychology and is awarded a Ph.D.

== Analysis ==
West writes First Person Plural using a first-person omniscient style, in which he is typically the narrator, but the reader can still see scenes that don't involve the narrator.

West struggles with denial of his condition for several years, beginning with the first “takeovers” of his body, until at last he begins to accept that his condition developed to protect him from the psychological experience of repeated childhood sexual abuse. West writes that he authored the book to present the public and treatment professionals with a first-hand account of DID so that others could more fully understand this often misdiagnosed condition. Furthermore, West states he wished to reach out to others like himself to show them that “they aren't alone, that there is hope.”

== Reception ==
A review in Time called the book "awkwardly written", but the book reached The New York Times bestseller list for two weeks in March 1999. Sales of the book were boosted by the author's appearance on The Oprah Winfrey Show.

Screen rights for a potential film were purchased by Disney for $1.15 million and Robin Williams was cast to play West with Eric Roth writing the screenplay. West held a meeting with Williams so he could prepare for the role, and both men would stay in contact until the latter's death. The film would enter development hell due to leadership changes at Disney, who still owns the rights to the script, but Williams held an indefinite attachment. West continues to hold a copy of the script at his home.
