= Dissociative identity disorder =

Mental illness with multiple personality states

- Other names: Multiple personality disorder, split personality disorder, split mind
- Specialty: Psychiatry, clinical psychology
- Symptoms: At least two distinct and relatively enduring personality states, recurrent episodes of dissociative amnesia, inexplicable intrusions into consciousness, alterations in sense of self, depersonalization and derealization, intermittent functional neurological symptoms
- Duration: Long-term
- Causes: Disputed
- Treatment: Psychotherapy
- Frequency: 1.1–1.5% lifetime prevalence in the general population

Dissociative identity disorder (DID), previously known as multiple personality disorder (MPD), is a dissociative disorder characterized by the presence of at least two personality states or "alters". The diagnosis is controversial and remains disputed. Proponents of DID support the trauma model, viewing the disorder as an organic response to severe childhood trauma. Critics of the trauma model support the sociogenic model of DID as a societal construct and learned behavior used to express distress; developed through iatrogenesis in therapy, cultural beliefs, and exposure to the behavior in media or online.

Public perceptions of the disorder were popularized by allegedly true stories in the 20th century; Sybil influenced many elements of the diagnosis, but was later found to be fraudulent. After multiple personality disorder (MPD) was recognized as a diagnosis in DSM-III in 1975, an epidemic of the disorder spread across North America, closely tied to the satanic panic. Therapists began using hypnosis on patients, believing they were discovering alters and recovering forgotten memories of satanic ritual abuse. Psychologists familiar with the malleability of memory argued they were constructing false memories. Diagnoses reached 50,000 by the 1990s, but the FBI failed to validate allegations made against caregivers. Skepticism increased when MPD patients recovered from the behavior, retracted their false memories, and brought successful lawsuits against therapists. A sharp decline in cases followed, and the disorder was reclassified as "dissociative identity disorder" (DID) in DSM-IV. In the 2020s, an uptick in DID cases followed the spread of viral videos about the disorder on TikTok and YouTube.

According to the DSM, the disorder is accompanied by memory gaps more severe than could be explained by ordinary forgetfulness, including gaps in consciousness, basic bodily functions, and perception. Research has challenged this premise; McNally found that although patients reported amnesia between alters, objective tests found their memory function was intact. After a sharp decline in publications in the early 2000s from the peak in the 1990s, Pope et al. (2006) described the disorder as an academic fad. Boysen et al. (2012) described research as steady, but lacking in convincing evidence.

According to the DSM-5-TR, early childhood trauma, typically starting before 5–6 years of age, places someone at risk of developing dissociative identity disorder. Across diverse geographic regions, 90% of people diagnosed with dissociative identity disorder report experiencing multiple forms of childhood abuse, such as rape, violence, neglect, or severe bullying. Other traumatic childhood experiences that have been reported include painful medical and surgical procedures, war, terrorism, attachment disturbance, loss of a loved one or loved ones, human trafficking, and dysfunctional family dynamics.

Treatment generally involves supportive care and psychotherapy. Medications can be used for comorbid disorders or targeted symptom relief. Lifetime prevalence, according to two epidemiological studies in the US and Turkey, is between 1.1–1.5% of the general population and 3.9% of those admitted to psychiatric hospitals in Europe and North America, though these figures have been argued to be both overestimates and underestimates. Comorbidity with other psychiatric conditions is high. DID is diagnosed 6–9 times more often in women than in men.

The number of recorded cases increased significantly in the latter half of the 20th century, along with the number of identities reported by those affected, but it is unclear whether increased rates of diagnosis are due to better recognition or to sociocultural factors such as mass media portrayals. The typical presenting symptoms in different regions of the world may also vary depending on culture, such as alter identities taking the form of possessing spirits, deities, ghosts, or mythical creatures in cultures where possession states are normative.

== Definitions ==
Dissociation, the term that underlies dissociative disorder, has been defined as a "compartmentalization of psychological functions such as identity and memory that are usually integrated", with a resulting symptomatic criteria characterized by "unbidden intrusions into awareness and behavior, with accompanying losses of continuity in subjective experience" or "inability to access information or control mental functions". Critics have argued that the term lacks a precise, empirical, and generally agreed upon definition, proposing to define it instead as an impairment in "meta-consciousness".

Many diverse experiences have been termed dissociative, ranging from normal failures in attention to the breakdowns in memory processes characterized by the dissociative disorders. It is therefore unknown whether there is a commonality among all dissociative experiences, or whether the range of mild to severe symptoms is a result of different etiologies and biological structures. Other terms used in the literature, including personality, personality state, identity, ego state, and amnesia, also lack agreed upon definitions. Multiple competing models exist that incorporate some non-dissociative symptoms while excluding dissociative ones.

Due to the lack of consensus about terminology in the study of DID, several terms have been proposed. One is ego state (behaviors and experiences possessing permeable boundaries with other such states but united by a common sense of self). Another is alters (each of which may have a separate autobiographical memory, independent initiative, and a sense of ownership over individual behavior).

== Signs and symptoms ==
The full presentation of dissociative identity disorder can occur at any age, but symptoms typically begin by ages 5–10. DID generally develops in childhood. According to the revised fifth edition of the Diagnostic and Statistical Manual of Mental Disorders (DSM-5-TR), symptoms of DID include "the presence of two or more distinct personality states" accompanied by the inability to recall personal information (an inability beyond what is expected from normal forgetting). Other DSM-5 symptoms include a loss of identity as related to individual distinct personality states, loss of subjective experience of the passage of time, and degradation of a sense of self and consciousness. In each individual, the clinical presentation varies, and the level of functioning can change from severe impairment to minimal impairment. The symptoms of dissociative amnesia are subsumed under a DID diagnosis; dissociative amnesia should not be diagnosed separately if DID criteria are met. Individuals with DID may experience distress from both the symptoms of DID (hearing voices, intrusive thoughts/emotions/impulses) and the consequences of the accompanying symptoms (inability to remember specific information or periods of time). The large majority of patients with DID report repeated childhood sexual or physical abuse, usually by caregivers, as well as organized abuse. Amnesia may be asymmetrical between identities; one identity may or may not be aware of what is known by another. Individuals with DID may be reluctant to discuss symptoms due to associations with abuse, shame, and fear.

Around half of the people with DID have fewer than 10 identities, and most have fewer than 100; a person with as many as 4,500 identities was reported by Richard Kluft in 1988. The average number of identities has increased over time, from two or three to an average of approximately 16. However, it is unclear whether this is due to an actual increase in identities or simply that the psychiatric community has become more accepting of a high number of compartmentalized memory components.

=== Comorbid disorders ===
The person's psychiatric history frequently contains multiple previous diagnoses of various disorders and treatment failures. The most common presenting complaint of DID is depression (90%) that is often treatment-resistant, with headaches and non-epileptic seizures being common neurologic symptoms. Comorbid disorders include post-traumatic stress disorder (PTSD), substance use disorders, eating disorders, anxiety disorders, personality disorders, and autism spectrum disorder. 30–70% of those diagnosed with DID have history of borderline personality disorder. Presentations of dissociation in people with schizophrenia differ from those with DID as not being rooted in trauma, and this distinction can be effectively tested; the conditions share a high rate of auditory hallucinations in the form of voices. Disturbed and altered sleep has also been suggested as having a role in dissociative disorders in general and specifically in DID. Alterations to environments are also said to affect DID patients.

== Causes ==
=== General ===
There are two competing theories on what causes dissociative identity disorder to develop. The trauma-related model suggests that complex trauma or severe adversity in childhood, also known as developmental trauma, increases the risk of someone developing dissociative identity disorder. The non-trauma related model, also referred to as the sociogenic or fantasy model, suggests that dissociative identity disorder is developed through high fantasy-proneness or suggestibility, roleplaying, or sociocultural influences.

The DSM-5-TR states that "early life trauma (e.g., neglect and physical, sexual, and emotional abuse, usually before ages 5-6 years) represents a major risk factor for dissociative identity disorder." Other risk factors reported include painful medical procedures, experiences of war, witnessing terrorism, or being trafficked in childhood. Dissociative disorders frequently occur after trauma, and the DSM-5-TR places them after the chapter on trauma- and stressor-related disorders to reflect this close relationship between complex trauma and dissociation.

=== Traumagenic model ===
Dissociative identity disorder is often conceptualized as "the most severe form of a childhood-onset post-traumatic stress disorder." According to many researchers, the etiology of dissociative identity is multifactorial, involving a complex interaction between developmental trauma, sociocultural influences, and biological factors.

People diagnosed with dissociative identity disorder often report that they have experienced physical or sexual abuse during childhood (although the accuracy of these reports has been disputed); others report overwhelming stress, serious medical illness, or other traumatic events during childhood. They also report more historical psychological trauma than those diagnosed with any other mental illness. (Note: Most of the published clinical case series are focused on chronic and complex forms of dissociative disorders. Data collected in diverse geographic locations such as North America [2], Puerto Rico [3], Western Europe [4], Turkey [5], and Australia [6] underline the consistency in clinical symptoms of dissociative disorders. These clinical case series have also documented that dissociative patients report the highest frequencies of childhood psychological trauma among all psychiatric disorders. Childhood sexual (57.1%–90.2%), emotional (57.1%), and physical (62.9%–82.4%) abuse and neglect (62.9%) are among them (2–6). — Sar (2011))

Severe sexual, physical, or psychological trauma in childhood has been proposed as an explanation for its development; awareness, memories, and emotions of harmful actions or events caused by the trauma are sequestered away from consciousness, and alternate parts form with differing memories, emotions, beliefs, temperament, and behavior. Dissociative identity disorder is also attributed to extremes of stress and disturbances of attachment to caregivers in early life. What may result in complex post-traumatic stress disorder (C-PTSD) in adults may become dissociative identity disorder when occurring in children, possibly due to their greater use of imagination as a form of coping as well as lack of developmental integration in childhood.

After age 6–9, developmental changes and a more coherent sense of self may lead to different, complex dissociative symptoms, identity disturbances, and trauma-related disorders following extreme trauma. Relationships between childhood abuse, disorganized attachment, and lack of social support are thought to be common risk factors leading to dissociative identity disorder. Although the role of a child's biological capacity to dissociate remains unclear, some evidence indicates a neurobiological impact of developmental stress. Moreover, in a review study done by Vedat, it was proposed that personalities of children are universally born unintegrated, and the various aspects of a child's undeveloped personality gradually integrate as the child's brain grows and develops.

Delinking early trauma from the etiology of dissociation has been explicitly rejected by those supporting the early trauma model. A 2012 review article argues the hypothesis that current or recent trauma may affect an individual's assessment of the more distant past, changing the experience of the past and resulting in dissociative states. Giesbrecht et al. have suggested there is no empirical evidence linking early trauma to dissociation, and instead suggest that problems with neuropsychological functioning, such as increased distractibility in response to certain emotions and contexts, account for dissociative features. A middle position hypothesizes that trauma, in some situations, alters neuronal mechanisms related to memory. Evidence is increasing that dissociative disorders are related both to a trauma history and to "specific neural mechanisms". It has also been suggested that there may be a genuine but more modest link between trauma and dissociative identity disorder, with early trauma causing increased fantasy-proneness, which may in turn render individuals more vulnerable to socio-cognitive influences surrounding the development of dissociative identity disorder.

Joel Paris states that the trauma model of dissociative identity disorder increased the appeal of the diagnosis among health care providers, patients and the public as it validated the idea that child abuse had lifelong, serious effects. Paris asserts that there is very little experimental evidence supporting the trauma-dissociation hypothesis, and no research showing that dissociation consistently links to long-term memory disruption.

=== Sociogenic model ===
Symptoms of dissociative identity disorder may be created by therapists using techniques to "recover" memories (such as the use of hypnosis to "access" alter identities, facilitate age regression or retrieve memories) on suggestible individuals. Referred to as the non-trauma-related model, or the sociocognitive model or fantasy model, it proposes that dissociative identity disorder is due to a person consciously or unconsciously behaving in certain ways promoted by cultural stereotypes, with unwitting therapists providing cues through improper therapeutic techniques. This model posits that behavior is enhanced by media portrayals of dissociative identity disorder. One example of the disorder in media portrayals, that supports this theory, is in purportedly true books and films in the 20th century; Sybil became the basis for many elements of the diagnosis, but it was later found to be fictionalized.

Proponents of the non-trauma-related model note that the dissociative symptoms are rarely present before intensive therapy by specialists in the treatment of dissociative identity disorder who, through the process of eliciting, conversing with, and identifying alters, shape or possibly create the diagnosis. While proponents note that dissociative identity disorder is accompanied by genuine suffering and the distressing symptoms, and can be diagnosed reliably using the DSM criteria, they are skeptical of the trauma-related etiology suggested by proponents of the trauma-related model. Proponents of non-trauma-related dissociative identity disorder are concerned about the possibility of hypnotizability, suggestibility, frequent fantasization and mental absorption predisposing individuals to dissociation. They note that a small subset of doctors are responsible for diagnosing the majority of individuals with dissociative identity disorder.

Psychologist Nicholas Spanos and others have suggested that, besides cases caused by therapy, dissociative identity disorder might result from role-playing. However, others disagree, arguing that there is no strong incentive for people to fabricate or maintain separate identities. They also cite reported histories of abuse as evidence. Other arguments that therapy can cause dissociative identity disorder include the lack of children diagnosed with DID, the sudden spike in rates of diagnosis after 1980 (although dissociative identity disorder was not a diagnosis until DSM-IV, published in 1994), the absence of evidence of increased rates of child abuse, the appearance of the disorder almost exclusively in individuals undergoing psychotherapy, particularly involving hypnosis, the presences of bizarre alternate identities (such as those claiming to be animals or mythological creatures) and an increase in the number of alternate identities over time (as well as an initial increase in their number as psychotherapy begins in DID-oriented therapy). These various cultural and therapeutic causes occur within a context of pre-existing psychopathology, notably borderline personality disorder, which is commonly comorbid with dissociative identity disorder. In addition, presentations can vary across cultures, such as Indian patients who only switch alters after a period of sleep, which is commonly how dissociative identity disorder is presented by the media within that country.

Proponents of non-trauma-related dissociative identity disorder state that the disorder is strongly linked to (possibly suggestive) psychotherapy, often involving recovered memories (memories that the person previously had amnesia for) or false memories, and that such therapy could cause additional identities. Such memories could be used to make an allegation of child sexual abuse. There is little agreement between those who see therapy as a cause and trauma as a cause. Supporters of therapy as a cause of dissociative identity disorder suggest that a small number of clinicians diagnosing a disproportionate number of cases would provide evidence for their position though it has also been claimed that higher rates of diagnosis in specific countries like the United States may be due to greater awareness of DID. Lower rates in other countries may be due to artificially low recognition of the diagnosis. It is argued that "the mechanisms described in the DSM–5 as 'dissociative amnesia' do not correspond to current knowledge of how memory works, either in an ordinary way or in intense stress circumstances", and that while traumatic memories may be forgotten and later remembered that this is due to regular processes of forgetting and remembering memories, and is not a distinct process. However, false memory syndrome per se is not regarded by mental health experts as a valid diagnosis, and has been described as "a non-psychological term originated by a private foundation whose stated purpose is to support accused parents," and critics argue that the concept has no empirical support, and further describe the False Memory Syndrome Foundation as an advocacy group that has distorted and misrepresented memory research.

A review of recent research into DID found not one empirical study into the sociocognitive model in the 2011-2021 period, identifying the model as "a source of unresolved criticism of the trauma model", not an empirical hypothesis in its own right. Some major skeptics of trauma-related DID have in recent years abandoned single-cause models of the disorder, arguing for an end to the controversy as no such model can provide a "complete or fully satisfactory account" of DID. As part of their "trans-theoretical" model Lynn et al. suggested that trauma may be more important than sociocognitive factors in clinical cases.

=== Children ===
The rarity of DID diagnoses in children is cited as a reason to doubt the validity of the disorder, and proponents of both etiologies believe that the discovery of dissociative identity disorder in a child who had never undergone treatment would critically undermine the non-trauma related model. Conversely, if children are found to develop dissociative identity disorder only after undergoing treatment it would challenge the trauma-related model. As of 2011, approximately 250 cases of dissociative identity disorder in children have been identified, though the data does not offer unequivocal support for either theory. While children have been diagnosed with dissociative identity disorder before therapy, several were presented to clinicians by parents who were themselves diagnosed with dissociative identity disorder; others were influenced by the appearance of dissociative identity disorder in popular culture or due to a diagnosis of psychosis due to hearing voices – a symptom also found in dissociative identity disorder. No studies have looked for children with dissociative identity disorder in the general population, and the single study that attempted to look for children with dissociative identity disorder not already in therapy did so by examining siblings of those already in therapy for dissociative identity disorder. An analysis of the diagnosis of children reported in scientific publications, 44 case studies of single patients were found to be evenly distributed (i.e., each case study was reported by a different author), but in articles regarding groups of patients, four researchers were responsible for the majority of the reports.

The initial theoretical description of dissociative identity disorder was that dissociative symptoms were a means of coping with extreme stress (particularly childhood sexual and physical abuse), but this belief has been challenged by the data of multiple research studies. Proponents of the trauma-related model claim the high correlation of child sexual and physical abuse reported by adults with dissociative identity disorder corroborates the link between trauma and dissociative identity disorder. However, the link between dissociative identity disorder and maltreatment has been questioned for several reasons. The studies reporting the links often rely on self-report rather than independent corroborations, and these results may be worsened by selection and referral bias. Most studies of trauma and dissociation are cross-sectional rather than longitudinal, which means researchers can not attribute causation, and studies avoiding recall bias have failed to corroborate such a causal link. In addition, studies rarely control for the many disorders comorbid with dissociative identity disorder, or family maladjustment (which is itself highly correlated with dissociative identity disorder). The popular association of dissociative identity disorder with childhood abuse is relatively recent, occurring only after the publication of Sybil in 1973. Most previous examples of "multiples" such as Chris Costner Sizemore, whose life was depicted in the book and film The Three Faces of Eve, reported no memory of childhood trauma.

== Pathophysiology ==
Despite research on DID including structural and functional magnetic resonance imaging, positron emission tomography, single-photon emission computed tomography, event-related potentials, and electroencephalography, no convergent neuroimaging findings have been identified regarding DID, with the exception of smaller hippocampal volume in DID patients. In addition, many of the studies that do exist were performed from an explicitly trauma-based position. There is no research to date regarding the neuroimaging and introduction of false memories in DID patients, or support for amnesia between alters. DID patients also appear to show deficiencies in tests of conscious control of attention and memorization (which also showed signs of compartmentalization for implicit memory between alters but no such compartmentalization for verbal memory) and increased and persistent vigilance and startle responses to sound. DID patients may also demonstrate altered neuroanatomy.

== Diagnosis ==
=== General ===
The fifth, revised edition of the American Psychiatric Association's Diagnostic and Statistical Manual of Mental Disorders (DSM-5-TR) diagnoses DID according to the diagnostic criteria found under code 300.14 (dissociative disorders). DID is often initially misdiagnosed because clinicians receive little training about dissociative disorders or DID, and often use standard diagnostic interviews that do not include questions about trauma, dissociation, or post-traumatic symptoms. This contributes to difficulties diagnosing the disorder, and to clinician bias.

DID is rarely diagnosed in children. The criteria require that an individual be recurrently controlled by two or more discrete identities or personality states, accompanied by memory lapses for important information that is not caused by alcohol, drugs or medications and other medical conditions such as complex partial seizures. In children, the symptoms must not be better explained by "imaginary playmates or other fantasy play". Diagnosis is normally performed by a clinically trained mental health professional such as a psychiatrist or psychologist through clinical evaluation, interviews with family and friends, and consideration of other ancillary material. Specially designed interviews (such as the SCID-D) and personality assessment tools may be used in the evaluation as well. Since most of the symptoms depend on self-report and are not concrete and observable, there is a degree of subjectivity in making the diagnosis. People are often disinclined to seek treatment, especially since their symptoms may not be taken seriously; thus dissociative disorders have been referred to as "diseases of hiddenness".

The diagnosis has been criticized by supporters of therapy as a cause or the sociocognitive hypothesis as they believe it is a culture-bound and often health care-induced condition. The social cues involved in diagnosis may be instrumental in shaping patient behavior or attribution, such that symptoms within one context may be linked to DID, while in another time or place the diagnosis could have been something other than DID. Other researchers disagree and argue that the existence of the condition and its inclusion in the DSM is supported by multiple lines of reliable evidence, with diagnostic criteria allowing it to be clearly discriminated from conditions it is often mistaken for (schizophrenia, borderline personality disorder, and seizure disorder). That a large proportion of cases are diagnosed by specific health care providers, and that symptoms have been created in nonclinical research subjects given appropriate cueing has been suggested as evidence that a small number of clinicians who specialize in DID are responsible for the creation of alters through therapy.

=== Differential diagnoses ===
Patients with DID are diagnosed with 5-7 comorbid disorders on average, higher than other mental conditions. Misdiagnoses (e.g., schizophrenia, bipolar disorder) are very common among patients with DID.

Due to overlapping symptoms, the differential diagnosis includes schizophrenia, normal and rapid-cycling bipolar disorder, epilepsy, borderline personality disorder, and autism spectrum disorder. Delusions or auditory hallucinations can be mistaken for speech by other personalities. Persistence and consistency of identities and behavior, amnesia, measures of dissociation or hypnotizability and reports from family members or other associates indicating a history of such changes can help distinguish DID from other conditions. A diagnosis of DID takes precedence over any other dissociative disorders. Distinguishing DID from malingering is a concern when financial or legal gains are an issue, and factitious disorder may also be considered if the person has a history of help or attention-seeking. Individuals who state that their symptoms are due to external spirits or entities entering their bodies are generally diagnosed with dissociative disorder not otherwise specified rather than DID due to the lack of identities or personality states. Most individuals who enter an emergency department and are unaware of their names are generally in a psychotic state. Although auditory hallucinations are common in DID, complex visual hallucinations may also occur. Those with DID generally have adequate reality testing. People with DID may have more positive and fewer negative Schneiderian symptoms of schizophrenia. The DID persona perceives any voices heard as coming from inside their heads whereas the schizophrenia persona perceives voices as external. In addition, individuals with psychosis are much less susceptible to hypnosis than those with DID. Difficulties in differential diagnosis are increased in children.

DID must be distinguished from, or determined if comorbid with, a variety of disorders including mood disorders, psychosis, anxiety disorders, PTSD, personality disorders, cognitive disorders, neurological disorders, epilepsy, somatoform disorder, factitious disorder, malingering, other dissociative disorders, and trance states. An additional aspect of the controversy of diagnosis is that there are many forms of dissociation and memory lapses, which can be common in both stressful and nonstressful situations and can be attributed to much less controversial diagnoses.

A relationship between DID and borderline personality disorder has been posited, with various clinicians noting overlap between symptoms and behaviors and it has been suggested that some cases of DID may arise "from a substrate of borderline traits". Reviews of DID patients and their medical records concluded that 30-70% of those diagnosed with DID have comorbid borderline personality disorder.

The DSM-5 elaborates on cultural background as an influence for some presentations of DID.

Many features of dissociative identity disorder can be influenced by the individual's cultural background. Individuals with this disorder may present with prominent medically unexplained neurological symptoms, such as non-epileptic seizures, paralyses, or sensory loss, in cultural settings where such symptoms are common. Similarly, in settings where normative possession is common (e.g., rural areas in the developing world, among certain religious groups in the United States and Europe), the fragmented identities may take the form of possessing spirits, deities, demons, animals, or mythical figures. Acculturation or prolonged intercultural contact may shape the characteristics of other identities (e.g., identities in India may speak English exclusively and wear Western clothes). Possession-form dissociative identity disorder can be distinguished from culturally accepted possession states in that the former is involuntary, distressing, uncontrollable, and often recurrent or persistent; involves conflict between the individual and their surrounding family, social, or work milieu; and is manifested at times and in places that violate the norms of the culture or religion.

== Validity disputed ==
DID is among the most controversial of the dissociative disorders and among the most controversial disorders found in the DSM-5-TR. The primary dispute is between those who believe DID is caused by traumatic stresses that split the mind into multiple identities, each with a separate set of memories, and those who believe that the symptoms of DID are produced artificially by certain psychotherapeutic practices or by patients playing a role they believe appropriate for a person with DID. The debate between the two positions is characterized by intense disagreement. Research has been characterized by poor methodology. Psychiatrist Joel Paris asserts that the idea that a personality is capable of splitting into independent alters is an unproven assertion at odds with research in cognitive psychology, while David Gleaves argues that recognition of DID was in fact prompted by developments in that field, including theories of parallel-distributed processing.

According to proponents of the trauma model, the ordinary "host" personality experiences memory gaps for their alter personalities. Research has challenged this idea: Richard McNally (2012) found that although patients reported amnesia between alters, objective tests found their memory function was intact.

Some people, such as Russell A. Powell and Travis L. Gee, believe that DID is caused by health care, i.e. symptoms of DID are created by therapists themselves via hypnosis. This implies that those with DID are especially susceptible to manipulation by hypnosis and suggestion. The iatrogenic model also sometimes states that treatment for DID is harmful. According to Brand, Loewenstein, and Spiegel, "claims that DID treatment is harmful are based on anecdotal cases, opinion pieces, reports of damage that are not substantiated in the scientific literature, misrepresentations of the data, and misunderstandings about DID treatment and the phenomenology of DID". Their claim is evidenced by the fact that only 5%–10% of people receiving treatment initially worsen in their symptoms.

Psychiatrists August Piper and Harold Merskey have challenged the trauma hypothesis, arguing that correlation does not imply causation—the fact that people with DID report childhood trauma does not mean trauma causes DID—and point to the rarity of the diagnosis before 1980 as well as a failure to find DID as an outcome in longitudinal studies of traumatized children. They assert that DID cannot be accurately diagnosed because of vague and unclear diagnostic criteria in the DSM and undefined concepts such as "personality state" and "identities", and question the lack of evidence of childhood abuse (beyond self-reports) in some people with DID, the lack of a defined threshold of abuse sufficient to induce DID, and the extremely small number of cases of children diagnosed with DID despite an average age of three years at the appearance of the first alter. Psychiatrist Colin Ross disagrees with Piper and Merskey's conclusion that DID cannot be accurately diagnosed, pointing to internal consistency between different structured dissociative disorder interviews (including the Dissociative Experiences Scale, Dissociative Disorders Interview Schedule, and Structured Clinical Interview for Dissociative Disorders) in the internal validity range of widely accepted mental illnesses such as schizophrenia and major depressive disorder. In his opinion, Piper and Merskey set their standard of proof higher than it is for other diagnoses. He also asserts that Piper and Merskey have cherry-picked data and not incorporated all relevant scientific literature, such as independent corroborating evidence of trauma.

== Treatment ==
=== Treatment under the sociogenic model ===
Proponents of the sociogenic model dispute that dissociative identity disorder is an organic response to trauma, but believe it is a socially constructed behavior and psychic contagion. Paul R. McHugh says that the disorder is "sustained in large part by the attention that doctors tend to pay to it. This means that it is not a mental condition that derives from nature, such as panic anxiety or major depression. It exists in the world as an artificial product of human devising". McHugh believed that proponents of dissociative identity disorder inadvertently worsen the patient's condition by validating the behavior and providing attention.

According to McHugh, at Johns Hopkins Hospital doctors should ignore the displays from "alters", and instead focus on treatment for other psychiatric problems patients present with. This method of treatment is reportedly successful:

What surprises many people is that multiple personalities tend to fall away quickly when ignored. Usually on our anorexia nervosa floor, patients who entered with MPD [multiple personality disorder] cease discussing their alters within a few days and often report that after a week or two of recovering their body weight and attending group therapy tied to their eating disorder, the ideas and preoccupations with their "alters" gradually vanished from their thinking.

According to a 2014 review, such views are based on anecdotal or non-peer-reviewed findings. In controlled studies, non-specialised treatment that did not address dissociative self-states did not substantially improve DID symptoms, though there may be improvement in patients' other conditions.

=== Treatments under the trauma model ===
The International Society for the Study of Trauma and Dissociation, proponents of the trauma model, have published guidelines for phase-oriented treatment in adults as well as children and adolescents that are widely used successfully in the field of DID treatment. The guidelines state that "a desirable treatment outcome is a workable form of integration or harmony among alternate identities". Some experts in treating people with DID use the techniques recommended in the 2011 treatment guidelines. The empirical research includes the longitudinal TOP DD treatment study, which found that patients showed "statistically significant reductions in dissociation, PTSD, distress, depression, hospitalisations, suicide attempts, self-harm, dangerous behaviours, drug use, and physical pain" and improved overall functioning. Treatment effects have been studied for over thirty years, with some studies having a follow-up of ten years. Adult and child treatment guidelines exist that suggest a three-phased approach.

Common treatment methods include an eclectic mix of psychotherapy techniques, including cognitive behavioral therapy (CBT), insight-oriented therapy, dialectical behavioral therapy (DBT), hypnotherapy, and eye movement desensitization and reprocessing (EMDR).

Hypnosis should be carefully considered when choosing both treatment and provider practitioners because of its dangers. For example, hypnosis can sometimes lead to false memories and false accusations of abuse by family, loved ones, friends, providers, and community members. Those who suffer from dissociative identity disorder have commonly been subject to actual abuse (sexual, physical, emotional, financial) by therapists, family, friends, loved ones, and community members.

Brief treatment due to managed care may be difficult, as individuals diagnosed with DID may have unusual difficulties in trusting a therapist and take a prolonged period to form a comfortable therapeutic alliance. Regular contact (at least weekly) is recommended, and treatment generally lasts years, not weeks or months. Sleep hygiene has been suggested as a treatment option, but has not been tested. In general, there are very few clinical trials on the treatment of DID, none of which were randomized controlled trials.

Therapy for DID is generally phase-oriented. Different alters may appear based on their greater ability to deal with specific situational stresses or threats. While some patients may initially present with a large number of alters, this number may reduce during treatment, though it is considered important for the therapist to become familiar with at least the more prominent personality states, as the "host" personality may not be the "true" identity of the patient. Specific alters may react negatively to therapy, fearing that the therapist's goal is to eliminate the alter (particularly those associated with illegal or violent activities). A more realistic and appropriate goal of treatment is to integrate adaptive responses to abuse, injury, or other threats into the overall personality structure.

The first phase of therapy focuses on symptoms and relieving the distressing aspects of the condition, ensuring the safety of the individual, improving the patient's capacity to form and maintain healthy relationships, and improving general daily life functioning. Comorbid disorders such as substance use disorder and eating disorders are addressed in this phase of treatment. The second phase focuses on stepwise exposure to traumatic memories and prevention of re-dissociation. The final phase focuses on reconnecting the identities of disparate alters into a single functioning identity with all its memories and experiences intact.

=== Prognosis ===
Little is known about prognosis of untreated DID. Symptoms commonly wax and wane over time. Patients with mainly dissociative and post-traumatic symptoms face a better prognosis than those with comorbid disorders or those still in contact with abusers, and the latter groups often face a lengthier and more difficult treatment course. Suicidal ideation, suicide attempts, and self-harm are common in the DID population. Duration of treatment can vary depending on patient goals, which can range from merely improving inter-alter communication and cooperation, to reducing inter-alter amnesia, to integration and fusion of all alters, but this last goal generally takes years, with trained and experienced psychotherapists.

== Epidemiology ==
=== General ===
According to the American Psychiatric Association, the 12-month prevalence of DID among adults in the US is 1.5%, with similar prevalence between women and men. Population prevalence estimates have been described to widely vary, with some estimates of DID in inpatient settings suggesting 1–9.6%. Reported rates in the community vary from 1% to 3% with higher rates among psychiatric patients. As of 2017, evidence suggested a prevalence of DID of 2–5% among psychiatric inpatients, 2–3% among outpatients, and 1% in the general population. Its true prevalence is a matter of controversy, with these figures being argued to be both heavy overestimates and heavy underestimates.

As of 2012, DID was diagnosed 5 to 9 times more commonly in women than men during young adulthood, although this may have been due to selection bias, as men meeting DID diagnostic criteria were suspected to end up in the criminal justice system rather than hospitals. DID diagnoses are extremely rare in children; much of the research on childhood DID occurred in the 1980s and 1990s and does not address ongoing controversies surrounding the diagnosis. DID occurs more commonly in young adults and declines in prevalence with age.

There is a poor awareness of DID in the clinical settings and the general public. Poor clinical education (or lack thereof) for DID and other dissociative disorders has been described in literature: "most clinicians have been taught (or assume) that DID is a rare disorder with a florid, dramatic presentation." Symptoms in patients are often not easily visible, which complicates diagnosis. DID has a high correlation with, and has been described as a form of, complex post-traumatic stress disorder. There is a significant overlap of symptoms between borderline personality disorder and DID.

=== Historical prevalence ===
Rates of diagnosed DID were increasing in the late 20th century, reaching a peak of diagnoses at approximately 40,000 cases by the end of the 20th century, up from less than 200 diagnoses before 1970. Initially, DID, along with the rest of the dissociative disorders were considered the rarest of psychological conditions, diagnosed in fewer than 100 by 1944, with only one further case reported in the next two decades. In the late 1970s and '80s, the number of diagnoses rose sharply. An estimate from the 1980s placed the incidence at 0.01%. Accompanying this rise was an increase in the number of alters, rising from only the primary and one alter personality in most cases, to an average of 13 in the mid-1980s (the increase in both number of cases and number of alters within each case are both factors in professional skepticism regarding the diagnosis). Others explain the increase as being due to the use of inappropriate therapeutic techniques in highly suggestible individuals, though this is itself controversial while proponents of DID claim the increase in incidence is due to increased recognition of and ability to recognize the disorder.

A 1996 essay suggested three possible causes for the sudden increase of DID diagnoses, among which the author suspects the first being most likely:

1. The result of therapist suggestions to suggestible people, much as Charcot's hysterics acted per his expectations.
2. Psychiatrists' past failure to recognize dissociation is being redressed by new training and knowledge.
3. Dissociative phenomena are actually increasing, but this increase only represents a new form of an old and protean entity: "hysteria".

Dissociative disorders were excluded from the Epidemiological Catchment Area Project.

=== North America ===
DID continues to be considered a controversial diagnosis; it was once regarded as a phenomenon confined to North America, though studies have since been published from DID populations across 6 continents. Although research has appeared discussing the appearance of DID in other countries and cultures and the condition has been described in non-English speaking nations and non-Western cultures, these reports all occur in English-language journals authored by international researchers who cite Western scientific literature.

=== Social media ===
A paper published in 2022 in the journal Comprehensive Psychiatry described how prolonged social media use, especially on video-sharing platforms including TikTok, has exposed young people, largely adolescent females, a core user group of TikTok, to a growing number of content creators making videos about their self-diagnosed disorders. "An increasing number of reports from the US, UK, Germany, Canada, and Australia have noted an increase in functional tic-like behaviors before and during the COVID-19 pandemic, coinciding with an increase in social media content related to[...]dissociative identity disorder." Authors noted that such cases of self-diagnosed DID (amongst other conditions) often differ from clinically defined symptoms of the disorder, creating the possibility of malingering, and potential negative impacts on those with clinically diagnosed DID seeking integrative therapy. The paper concluded that there "is an urgent need for focused empirical research investigation into this concerning phenomenon that is related to the broader research and discourse examining social media influences on mental health".

== History ==
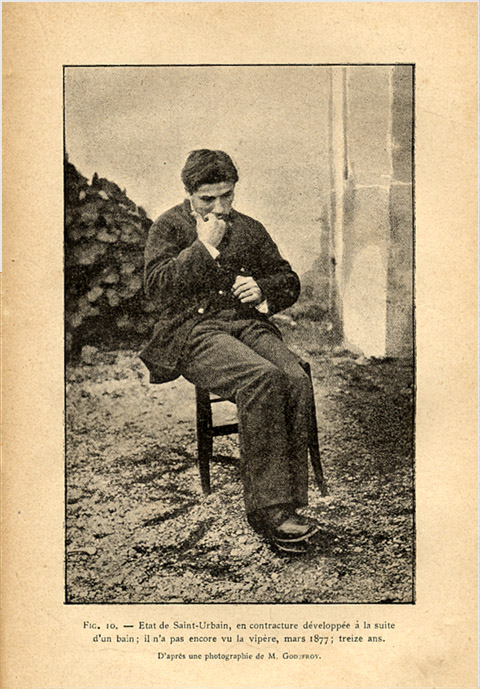
One of ten photogravure portraits of Louis Vivet published in Variations de la personnalité by Henri Bourru and Prosper Ferdinand Burot

=== Early references ===
In the 19th century, dédoublement, or "double consciousness", the historical precursor to DID, was frequently described as a state of sleepwalking, with scholars hypothesizing that the patients were switching between a normal consciousness and a "somnambulistic state".

An intense interest in spiritualism, parapsychology and hypnosis continued throughout the 19th and early 20th centuries, running in parallel with John Locke's views that there was an association of ideas requiring the coexistence of feelings with awareness of the feelings. Hypnosis, which was pioneered in the late 18th century by Franz Mesmer and Armand-Marie Jacques de Chastenet, Marques de Puységur, challenged Locke's association of ideas. Hypnotists reported what they thought were second personalities emerging during hypnosis and wondered how two minds could coexist.

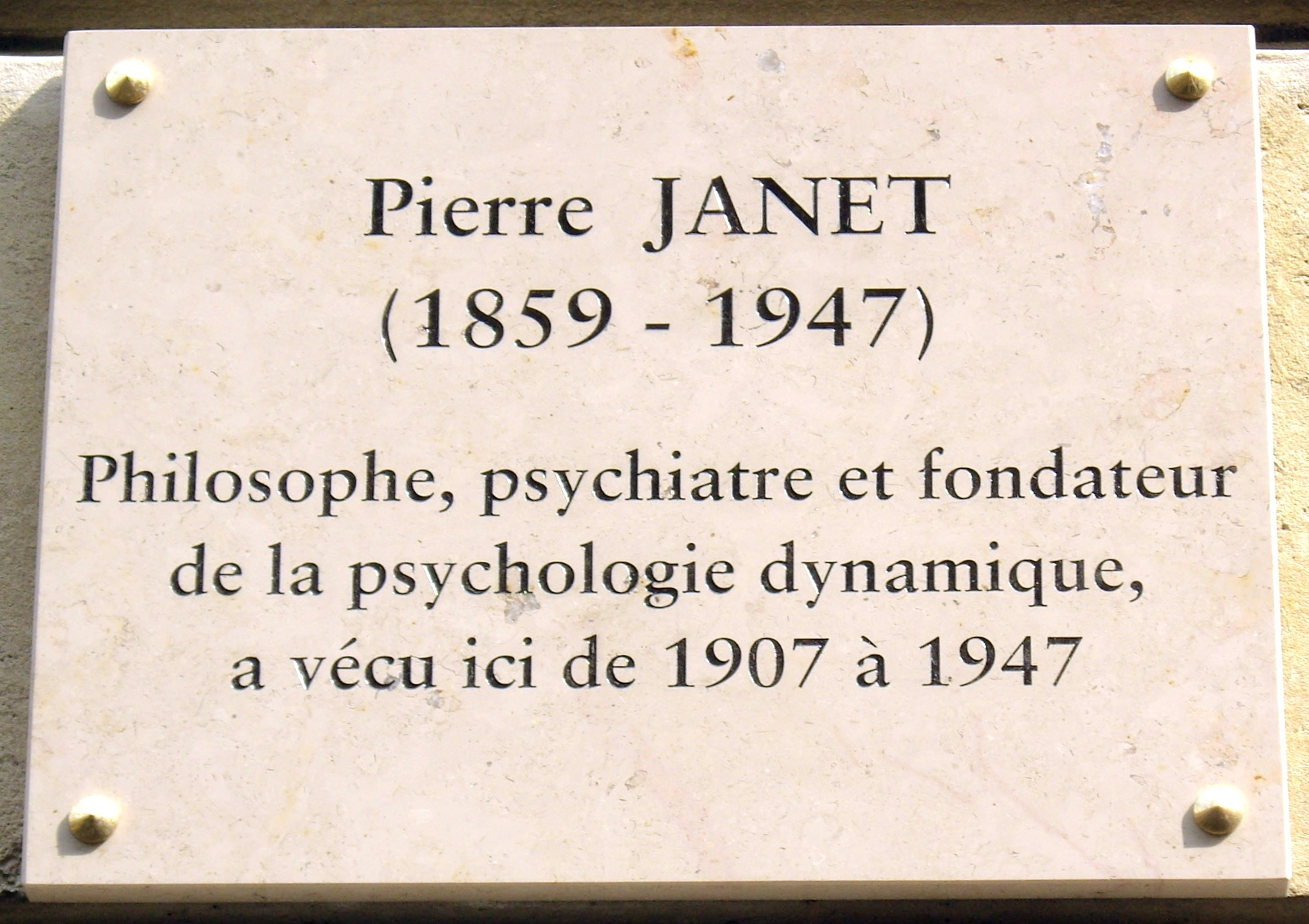
The plaque on the former house of Pierre Marie Félix Janet (1859–1947), the philosopher and psychologist who first alleged a connection between events in the subject's past and present mental health, also coining the words "dissociation" and "subconscious"

In the 19th century, there were several reported cases of multiple personalities, which Rieber estimated would be close to 100. Epilepsy was seen as a factor in some cases, and discussion of this connection continues into the present era.

By the late 19th century, there was a general acceptance that emotionally traumatic experiences could cause long-term disorders that might display a variety of symptoms. These conversion disorders were found to occur in even the most resilient individuals, but with profound effect in someone with emotional instability like Louis Vivet (1863–?), who had a traumatic experience as a 17-year-old when he encountered a viper. Vivet was the subject of countless medical papers and became the most studied case of dissociation in the 19th century.

Between 1880 and 1920, various international medical conferences devoted time to sessions on dissociation. It was in this climate that Jean-Martin Charcot introduced his ideas of the impact of nervous shocks as a cause for a variety of neurological conditions. One of Charcot's students, Pierre Janet, took these ideas and went on to develop his own theories of dissociation. One of the first individuals diagnosed with multiple personalities to be scientifically studied was Clara Norton Fowler, under the pseudonym Christine Beauchamp; American neurologist Morton Prince studied Fowler between 1898 and 1904, describing her case study in his 1906 monograph, Dissociation of a Personality.

=== 20th century ===
In the early 20th century, interest in dissociation and multiple personalities waned for several reasons. After Charcot died in 1893, many of his so-called hysterical patients were exposed as frauds, and Janet's association with Charcot tarnished his theories of dissociation. Sigmund Freud recanted his earlier emphasis on dissociation and childhood trauma.

In 1908, Eugen Bleuler introduced the term "schizophrenia" to represent a revised disease concept for Emil Kraepelin's dementia praecox. Whereas Kraepelin's natural disease entity was anchored in the metaphor of progressive deterioration and mental weakness and defect, Bleuler offered a reinterpretation based on dissociation or "splitting" (Spaltung) and widely broadened the inclusion criteria for the diagnosis. A review of the Index medicus from 1903 through 1978 showed a dramatic decline in the number of reports of multiple personality after the diagnosis of schizophrenia became popular, especially in the United States. The rise of the broad diagnostic category of dementia praecox has also been posited in the disappearance of "hysteria" (the usual diagnostic designation for cases of multiple personalities) by 1910. Several factors helped create a large climate of skepticism and disbelief; paralleling the increased suspicion of DID was the decline of interest in dissociation as a laboratory and clinical phenomenon.

Starting in about 1927, there was a large increase in the number of reported cases of schizophrenia, which was matched by an equally large decrease in the number of multiple personality reports. With the rise of a uniquely American reframing of dementia praecox/schizophrenia as a functional disorder or "reaction" to psychobiological stressors – a theory first put forth by Adolf Meyer in 1906—many trauma-induced conditions associated with dissociation, including "shell shock" or "war neuroses" during World War I, were subsumed under these diagnoses. It was argued in the 1980s that DID patients were often misdiagnosed with schizophrenia.

The public, however, was exposed to psychological ideas that took their interest. Mary Shelley's Frankenstein, Robert Louis Stevenson's Strange Case of Dr Jekyll and Mr Hyde, and many short stories by Edgar Allan Poe had a formidable impact.

==== The Three Faces of Eve ====
In 1957, with the publication of the bestselling book The Three Faces of Eve by psychiatrists Corbett H. Thigpen and Hervey M. Cleckley, based on a case study of their patient Chris Costner Sizemore, and the subsequent popular movie of the same name, the American public's interest in multiple personality was revived. More cases of dissociative identity disorder were diagnosed in the following years. The cause of the sudden increase of cases is indefinite, but it may be attributed to the increased awareness, which revealed previously undiagnosed cases or new cases may have been induced by the influence of the media on the behavior of individuals and the judgement of therapists. During the 1970s, an initially small number of clinicians campaigned to have it considered a legitimate diagnosis.

==== Book and film Sybil ====
In 1974, the highly influential book Sybil was published, and later made into a miniseries in 1976 and again in 2007. Describing what Robert Rieber called "the third most famous of multiple personality cases," it presented a detailed discussion of the problems of treatment of "Sybil Isabel Dorsett", a pseudonym for Shirley Ardell Mason.

Though the book and subsequent films helped popularize the diagnosis and trigger an epidemic of the diagnosis, later analysis of the case suggested different interpretations, ranging from Mason's problems having been caused by the therapeutic methods and sodium pentathol injections used by her psychiatrist, C. B. Wilbur, or an inadvertent hoax due in part to the lucrative publishing rights, though this conclusion has itself been challenged.

David Spiegel, a Stanford psychiatrist whose father treated Shirley Ardell Mason on occasion, says that his father described Mason as "a brilliant hysteric. He felt that Wilbur tended to pressure her to exaggerate on the dissociation she already had." As media attention on DID increased, so too did the controversy surrounding the diagnosis.

=== History in the DSM ===
The DSM-II used the term hysterical neurosis, dissociative type. It described the possible occurrence of alterations in the patient's state of consciousness or identity, and included the symptoms of "amnesia, somnambulism, fugue, and multiple personality". The DSM-III grouped the diagnosis with the other four major dissociative disorders using the term "multiple personality disorder". The DSM-IV made more changes to DID than any other dissociative disorder, and renamed it DID. The name was changed for two reasons: First, the change emphasizes the main problem is not a multitude of personalities, but rather a lack of a single, unified identity and an emphasis on "the identities as centers of information processing". Second, the term "personality" is used to refer to "characteristic patterns of thoughts, feelings, moods, and behaviors of the whole individual", while for a patient with DID, the switches between identities and behavior patterns is the personality. It is, for this reason, the DSM-IV-TR referred to "distinct identities or personality states" instead of personalities. The diagnostic criteria also changed to indicate that while the patient may name and personalize alters, they lack independent, objective existence. The changes also included the addition of amnesia as a symptom, which was not included in the DSM-III-R because despite being a core symptom of the condition, patients may experience "amnesia for the amnesia" and fail to report it. Amnesia was replaced when it became clear that the risk of false negative diagnoses was low because amnesia was central to DID.

The ICD-10 places the diagnosis in the category of "dissociative disorders", within the subcategory of "other dissociative (conversion) disorders", but continues to list the condition as multiple personality disorder.

The DSM-IV-TR criteria for DID have been criticized for failing to capture the clinical complexity of DID, lacking usefulness in diagnosing individuals with DID (for instance, by focusing on the two least frequent and most subtle symptoms of DID) producing a high rate of false negatives and an excessive number of DDNOS diagnoses, for excluding possession (seen as a cross-cultural form of DID), and for including only two "core" symptoms of DID (amnesia and self-alteration) while failing to discuss hallucinations, trance-like states, somatoform, depersonalization, and derealization symptoms. Arguments have been made for allowing diagnosis through the presence of some, but not all of the characteristics of DID rather than the current exclusive focus on the two least common and noticeable features. The DSM-IV-TR criteria have also been criticized for being tautological, using imprecise and undefined language and for the use of instruments that give a false sense of validity and empirical certainty to the diagnosis.

The DSM-5 updated the definition of DID in 2013, summarizing the changes as:

Several changes to the criteria for dissociative identity disorder have been made in DSM-5. First, Criterion A has been expanded to include certain possession-form phenomena and functional neurological symptoms to account for more diverse presentations of the disorder. Second, Criterion A now specifically states that transitions in identity may be observable by others or self-reported. Third, according to Criterion B, individuals with dissociative identity disorder may have recurrent gaps in recall for everyday events, not just for traumatic experiences. Other text modifications clarify the nature and course of identity disruptions.

Between 1968 and 1980, the term that was used for dissociative identity disorder was "Hysterical neurosis, dissociative type". The APA wrote in the second edition of the DSM: "In the dissociative type, alterations may occur in the patient's state of consciousness or in his identity, to produce such symptoms as amnesia, somnambulism, fugue, and multiple personality." The number of cases sharply increased in the late 1970s and throughout the 80s, and the first scholarly monographs on the topic appeared in 1986.

==== Re-classifications ====
The DSM-III intentionally omitted the terms "hysteria" and "neurosis", naming those as Dissociative Disorders, which included Multiple Personality Disorder, and also added Post-traumatic Stress Disorder in Anxiety Disorders section.

In the opinion of McGill University psychiatrist Joel Paris, this inadvertently legitimized them by forcing textbooks, which mimicked the structure of the DSM, to include a separate chapter on them, and increased the diagnosis of dissociative conditions. Once a rarely occurring spontaneous phenomenon (research in 1944 showed only 76 cases), the diagnosis became "an artifact of bad (or naïve) psychotherapy" as patients capable of dissociating were accidentally encouraged to express their symptoms by "overly fascinated" therapists.

"Interpersonality amnesia" was removed as a diagnostic feature from the DSM-III in 1987, which may have contributed to the increasing frequency of the diagnosis. There were 200 reported cases of DID as of 1980, and 20,000 from 1980 to 1990. Joan Acocella reports that 40,000 cases were diagnosed from 1985 to 1995. Scientific publications regarding DID peaked in the mid-1990s, rapidly declined, then has continued on a steady increasing trend since.

In 1994, the fourth edition of the DSM replaced the criteria again and changed the name of the condition from "multiple personality disorder" to the current "dissociative identity disorder" to emphasize the importance of changes to consciousness and identity rather than personality. The inclusion of interpersonality amnesia helped to distinguish DID from dissociative disorder not otherwise specified (DDNOS), but the condition retains an inherent subjectivity due to difficulty in defining terms such as personality, identity, ego-state, and even amnesia. The ICD-10 classified DID as a "Dissociative [conversion] disorder" and used the name "multiple personality disorder" with the classification number of F44.81. In the ICD-11, the World Health Organization have classified DID under the name "dissociative identity disorder" (code 6B64), and most cases formerly diagnosed as DDNOS are classified as "partial dissociative identity disorder" (code 6B65).

=== 21st century ===
A 2006 study compared scholarly research and publications on DID and dissociative amnesia to other mental health conditions, such as anorexia nervosa, alcohol use disorder, and schizophrenia from 1984 to 2003. The results were found to be unusually distributed, with a very low level of publications in the 1980s followed by a significant rise that peaked in the mid-1990s and subsequently rapidly declined in the decade following. Compared to 25 other diagnoses, the mid-1990s "bubble" of publications regarding DID was unique. In the opinion of the authors of the review, the publication results suggest a period of "fashion" that waned, and that the two diagnoses "presently do not command widespread scientific acceptance." A 2024 review found "steady" continued research after 2011, with 160 academic studies located in the 2011-2021 period, an increase of 60% over the previous decade. Authors previously skeptical of DID have adopted a "trans-theoretical" approach where trauma and social factors are simply two of many potential factors, indicating that "the heat of past DID controversies has diminished some with the rise of multidimensional models of psychopathology".

== Society and culture ==
=== Legal issues ===
People with dissociative identity disorder may be involved in legal cases as a witness, defendant, or the victim/injured party. Claims of DID have been used only rarely to argue criminal insanity in court. In the United States, dissociative identity disorder has previously been found to meet the Frye test as a generally accepted medical condition, and the newer Daubert standard. Within legal circles, DID has been described as one of the most disputed psychiatric diagnoses and forensic assessments are needed. For defendants whose defense states they have a diagnosis of DID, courts must distinguish between those who genuinely have DID and those who are malingering to avoid responsibility. Expert witnesses are typically used to assess defendants in such cases, although some of the standard assessments like the MMPI-2 were not developed for people with a trauma history and the validity scales may incorrectly suggest malingering. In DID, evidence about the altered states of consciousness, actions of alter identities and episodes of amnesia may be excluded from a court if they are not considered relevant, although different countries and regions have different laws. A diagnosis of DID may be used to claim a defense of not guilty by reason of insanity, but this very rarely succeeds, or of diminished capacity, which may reduce the length of a sentence. DID may also affect competency to stand trial. A not guilty by reason of insanity plea was first used successfully in an American court in 1978, in the State of Ohio v. Milligan case. However, a DID diagnosis is not automatically considered a justification for an insanity verdict, and since Milligan the few cases claiming insanity have largely been unsuccessful.

Bennett G. Braun was an American psychiatrist known for his promotion of the concept of multiple personality disorder (now called "dissociative identity disorder") and involvement in promoting the "Satanic Panic", a moral panic around a discredited conspiracy theory that led to thousands of people being wrongfully medically treated or investigated for nonexistent crimes.

=== In popular culture ===
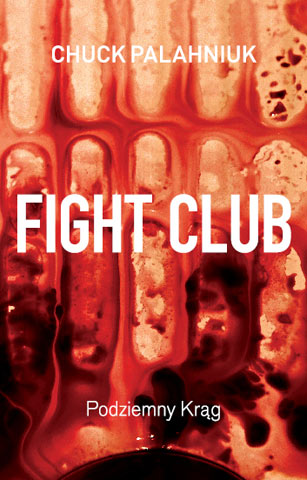
The book and movie Fight Club features a protagonist who is revealed to have DID.

The public's long fascination with DID has led to a number of different books and films, with many representations described as increasing stigma by perpetuating the myth that people with mental illness are usually dangerous. Movies about DID have been also criticized for poor representation of both DID and its treatment, including "greatly overrepresenting" the role of hypnosis in therapy, showing a significantly smaller number of personalities than many people with DID have, and misrepresenting people with DID as having theatrical and blatant switches between very conspicuous and different alters. Some movies are parodies and ridicule DID, for instance, Me, Myself & Irene, which also incorrectly states that DID is schizophrenia. In some stories, DID is used as a plot device, e.g. in Fight Club, and in whodunnit stories like Secret Window.

United States of Tara was reported to be the first US television series with DID as its focus, and a professional commentary on each episode was published by the International Society for the Study of Trauma and Dissociation.

A number of people with DID have publicly spoken about their experiences, including comedian and talk show host Roseanne Barr, who interviewed Truddi Chase, author of When Rabbit Howls; Chris Costner Sizemore, the subject of The Three Faces of Eve, Cameron West, author of First Person Plural: My life as a multiple, and NFL player Herschel Walker, author of Breaking Free: My life with dissociative identity disorder.

In The Three Faces of Eve (1957) hypnosis is used to identify a childhood trauma which then allows her to fuse from three identities into just one. However, Sizemore's books I'm Eve and A Mind of My Own revealed that this did not last; she later attempted suicide, sought further treatment, and had twenty-two personalities rather than three. Sizemore re-entered therapy and by 1974 had achieved a lasting recovery. Voices Within: The Lives of Truddi Chase portrays many of the 92 personalities Chase described in her book When Rabbit Howls, and is unusual in breaking away from the typical ending of integrating into one. Frankie & Alice (2010), starring Halle Berry was based on a real person with DID. In popular culture dissociative identity disorder is often confused with schizophrenia, as was true of the 1958 episode "The Case of the Deadly Double" of the Perry Mason TV series, where a woman shown as having two very distinct personas is described as being schizophrenic On the other hand, some movies advertised as representing dissociative identity disorder may be more representative of psychosis or schizophrenia, for example Psycho (1960).

In his book The C.I.A. Doctors: Human Rights Violations by American Psychiatrists, psychiatrist Colin A. Ross states that based on documents obtained through freedom of information legislation, a psychiatrist linked to Project MKULTRA reported being able to deliberately induce dissociative identity disorder using a variety of highly aversive and abusive techniques, creating a Manchurian Candidate for military purposes.

In the USA Network television production Mr. Robot, the protagonist Elliot Alderson was created using anecdotal experiences of DID of the show's creator's friends. Sam Esmail said he consulted with a psychologist who "concretized" the character's mental health conditions, especially his plurality.

In M. Night Shyamalan's Unbreakable superhero film series (specifically, the films Split and Glass), Kevin Wendell Crumb is diagnosed with DID, and that some of the personalities have super-human powers. Experts and advocates say the films are a negative portrayal of DID, and the films promote the stigmatization of the disorder.

In the 1993 Indian psychological horror film Manichithrathazhu, the central character Ganga exhibits symptoms depicted as DID, where an alternate personality, Nagavalli, expresses suppressed emotions. While lauded for popularizing mental health discussions, the film's dramatic, ritualistic "cure" is considered an oversimplification of DID's complex treatment. Nevertheless, it remains a culturally significant portrayal.

In the 1997 Japanese role-playing game Final Fantasy VII, the protagonist Cloud Strife is shown to have an identity disorder involving false memories as a result of post-traumatic stress disorder (PTSD). Sharon Packer has identified Cloud as having DID.

In Marvel Comics, the character of Moon Knight is shown to have DID. In the TV series Moon Knight based on the comic book character, protagonist Marc Spector is depicted with DID; the website for the National Alliance on Mental Illness appears in the series' end credits.

=== Online subculture ===
A community of self-identifying "plurals" exists on social media, including YouTube, Reddit, Discord, and TikTok with an associated experience called multiplicity. In some cases, members of the community have claimed to have DID diagnoses or sought them out, but several high-profile members of this community have been criticized for allegedly faking their condition for views, or for portraying the disorder lightheartedly. Psychologist Naomi Torres-Mackie, head of research at The Mental Health Coalition, has stated "All of a sudden, all of my adolescent patients think that they have this, and they don't ... Folks start attaching clinical meaning and feeling like, 'I should be diagnosed with this. I need medication for this', when actually a lot of these experiences are normative and don't need to be pathologized or treated". Lately, the plural community has been divided between those who argue that anyone without DID diagnosis is likely fabricating their experience with others rejecting the DID diagnosis entirely and instead arguing against pathologizing the plural identity at all.

=== Advocacy ===
Some advocates consider recognizing 'positive plurality' and also the use of plural pronouns such as "we" and "our". Advocates also challenge the necessity of integration. Timothy Baynes argues that forcing people to undergo it as a treatment is "seriously immoral".

A DID Awareness Day takes place on March 5 annually, participants displaying a multicolored awareness ribbon, based on the idea of a "crazy quilt."
