= Chris Costner Sizemore =

American depicted in The Three Faces of Eve (1927–2016)

Christine Costner Sizemore
- Born: Christine Costner; April 4, 1927; Edgefield, South Carolina, U.S.
- Died: July 24, 2016 (aged 89); Ocala, Florida, U.S.
- Known for: Dissociative identity disorder case depicted in The Three Faces of Eve
- Spouses: Gene Rogers (divorced); Don Sizemore (his death)
- Children: 2

Christine Costner Sizemore (April 4, 1927 – July 24, 2016) was an American woman who, in the 1950s, was diagnosed with multiple personality disorder, now known as dissociative identity disorder. Her case was depicted in the 1950s book The Three Faces of Eve, written by her psychiatrists, Corbett H. Thigpen and Hervey M. Cleckley, upon which the film of the same name, starring Joanne Woodward, was based. Sizemore went public with her identity in the 1970s.

== Background ==
Sizemore was born Christine Costner on April 4, 1927, to Asa "Acie" Costner and Eunice Zueline Hastings in Edgefield, South Carolina.

In accordance with then-current modes of thought on the disorder, Thigpen reported that Sizemore had developed multiple personalities as a result of her witnessing two deaths and a horrifying accident within three months as a small child. However, in Sizemore's own report, these traumatic incidents only triggered the evidencing of selves that were already present:

Despite authorities' claims to the contrary, my former alters were not fragments of my birth personality. They were entities, whole in their own rights, who coexisted with my birth personality before I was born. They were not me, but they remain intrinsically related to what it means to be me.

In her book, I'm Eve (1977), Christine describes many phases of her life; the first she titles the separation, labelled the years 1927 to 1946, wherein she identifies a selection of the selves or alters and their memories. The first alter she calls from her memory is the red haired stranger who witnesses these very first traumatic events with Christine, whereby she can recollect this girl (one alter) in her memories. These memories match the ones Thigpen had attributed to her development of multiple personalities.

- Her earliest memory, at 10 months old, is of the funeral of a five-month-old cousin. She writes of her fear of the white casket, her aunts mourning, her father closing the casket lid, and her concern that her cousin might be scared of the dark, alluding to her own fears of darkness and of death. She later describes, in her book, her guilt about still being alive when her cousin could not be.
- Thigpen pointed to three traumatic events Christine witnessed at age 2 as causing her dissociation. The first she recalls is of a drunken old man who had died in a water-filled ditch and was retrieved by her uncle and father. She describes the old man’s decomposition and being scolded by her mother for having witnessed this.
- In the second event, Christine is again scolded by her mother, this time for sitting under her legs. As Christine's mother is churning milk, the glass jar breaks unexpectedly and the mother presses the shards to her body to prevent Christine from being cut. Christine observes in horror as her mother's arm is slashed and is too paralyzed with fear to get aid for her mother.
- The final event is an incident that occurred at the saw mill where her father worked. When Christine’s mother hears the whistle that indicates an accident at the mill, she and Christine go to the mill and witness the dismemberment of a worker. Following these incidents, Christine is chronically and intensely worried about the potential illness and/or death of her family members and loved ones.

== Diagnosis and The Three Faces of Eve ==
Thigpen and Cleckley diagnosed Sizemore and treated her at no cost for several years. In 1956, while still under their care, she signed over the rights to her life story to 20th Century Fox, although it was later alleged that she had signed without legal representation and included her alternate personalities' consent.

The Three Faces of Eve became a bestseller when it was published in 1957. It was written by Thigpen and Cleckley with limited input from Sizemore.

In 1958, she co-wrote (with James Poling) Strangers in My Body: The Final Face of Eve, using the pseudonym Evelyn Lancaster. She later wrote two follow-ups: I'm Eve (1977), written with Elen Sain Pittillo; and A Mind of My Own (1989).

In 1970, she started treatment with Tony Tsitos, whom she credited with making the greatest progress in integrating the divergent personalities over the next four years. According to both Sizemore and the psychiatrists who worked with her after her treatment with Thigpen and Cleckley, it was not until she was in Tsitos' care that she became aware that she experienced not just 3 selves but more than 20 personalities, which eventually were unified. It was reported that her selves were presented in groups of three at a time.

Sizemore stated that she felt exploited and objectified by the media blitz surrounding the book and film of Three Faces of Eve. Upon discovering in 1988 that her legal rights to her own life story had been signed away to 20th Century Fox by Thigpen, Sizemore went to Manhattan's Federal District Court to contest the contract. She accepted an out-of-court settlement, and no further films were made about her.

Sizemore's papers, covering 1952 through 1989, have been acquired by the Duke University Library. An overview of the collection and a summary of Sizemore's story are included on its website.

Sizemore was interviewed on the BBC News series Hardtalk on March 25, 2009.

== Death ==
Sizemore died of a heart attack in hospice care on July 24, 2016, in Ocala, Florida. She was 89 years old.

== See also ==
- The Three Faces of Eve
- List of autobiographers
- List of pen names
- List of people from South Carolina
- Shirley Ardell Mason
