= Christine Beauchamp (pseudonym) =

American psychological case study patient

- Other names: Clara Norton Fowler
- Known for: Early case of multiple personality disorder (now known as dissociative identity disorder)

Christine Beauchamp was the pseudonym of a woman named Clara Norton Fowler, studied by American neurologist Morton Prince between 1898 and 1904. She was one of the first persons diagnosed as having multiple personalities (a disorder now termed dissociative identity disorder). Prince reported her case in his 1906 book-length description of her disorder.

== History ==
Beauchamp was a 23-year-old student who came to Prince, a Boston neurologist, because she was suffering from a "nervous disorder". Her alternate personalities first appeared under hypnotherapy, and later spontaneously. Prince was active in naming the personalities and in expressing a preference for one of them. Prince "cured" her by reconciling her other personalities with the original one. Beauchamp later married one of Prince's assistants.

Prince described Beauchamp as having three main distinct personalities, each of which had differing degrees of knowledge of the others. He wrote: "although making use of the same body, each ... has a distinctly different character ... manifested by different trains of thought, ... views, beliefs, ideals, and temperament, and by different acquisitions, tastes, habits, experiences, and memories..."

== Importance ==
This case was widely cited as the "prototypical case" of dissociative identity disorder, even into the 1970s.
