= Camuset =

Camuset is a surname. Notable people with the surname include:

- Émile Camuset, French clothing merchant
- Jean Camuset (1893–?), French rower
