= Morton Prince =

American physician (1854–1929)

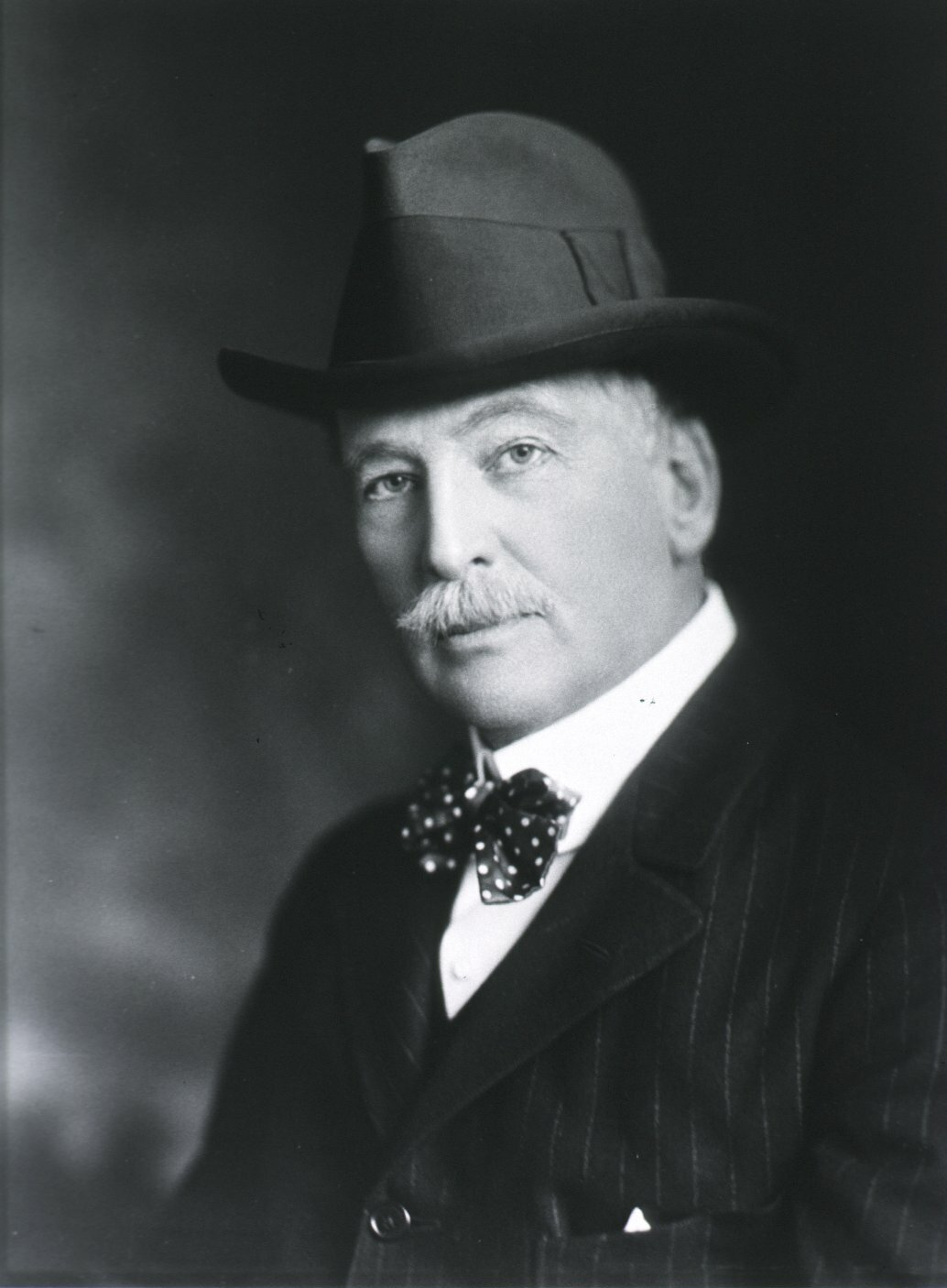
- Prince in 1916
- Born: December 21, 1854; Boston, Massachusetts, U.S.
- Died: August 31, 1929 (aged 74); Brookline, Massachusetts, U.S.

Morton Henry Prince (December 22, 1854 – August 31, 1929) was an American physician who specialized in neurology and abnormal psychology, and was a leading force in establishing psychology as a clinical and academic discipline.

He was part of a handful of men who disseminated European ideas about psychopathology, especially in understanding dissociative phenomena; and helped found the Journal of Abnormal Psychology in 1906, which he edited until his death.

== Early life and marriage ==
Morton Prince came from a wealthy Boston family and was involved in the social and intellectual life of that city. He was born to Frederick O. Prince, a state senator and future Boston mayor and Helen Susan Prince (née Henry). Prince later in life learned that part of his family were descended from early American Sephardic Jews, and became interested in philanthropy and concerns of his ancestral community. He went to private schools and the Boston Latin School and then to Harvard College. He obtained his medical degree from Harvard Medical School in 1879. After Harvard, he took a Grand Tour of Europe, a near requirement for upper-class Americans at that time. Prince hoped to gain more clinical instruction at Vienna and Strasbourg. It was in Paris that he visited Jean Martin Charcot at the Salpêtrière. He was quite impressed with Charcot's theories but returned to Boston to set up an otolaryngology practice. However, the spell of the charismatic Charcot was strong and he quickly switched his practice to neurology, and even adopted Charcot's showmanship for teaching his classes.

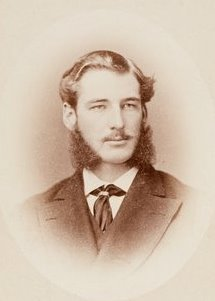
Prince c1875

He married Fannie Lithgow Payson, daughter of Arthur Lithgow Payson and Claire Endicott Peabody. They had at least two children, Claire Morton Prince, born about 1885, and Morton Peabody Prince, born August 6, 1888.

During the First World War at Hotel Lotti, Paris, France, Dr Prince was the director of an information bureau and home intended for soldiers and sailors from Massachusetts.

== Professional accomplishments ==
Prince became interested in abnormal psychology and neurology because both his wife and mother had psychogenic symptoms including depression and anxiety. He became a devotee and proponent of the use of suggestion in treating mental illnesses in the United States and drew around him important practitioners in the burgeoning field of abnormal psychology of that time: Boris Sidis, James Jackson Putnam, William James, G. Stanley Hall, to name but a few. He became the American expert in dissociative disorders, which he also called multiple personality disorder.

Prince created the Journal of Abnormal (and Social) Psychology with the help from psychologist Boris Sidis. Prince published a few of his articles in this journal including The Dissociation of a Personality in 1906, The Unconscious in 1914, and Clinical and Experimental Studies in Personality in 1929. This journal served as an outlet especially for those who were interested in neurotic disorders. Prince edited the Journal of Abnormal (and Social) Psychology up until his death in 1929. This journal was eventually turned over to the American Psychological Association. Overall, Prince had six of his books published and had written over 100 scientific papers that included information on general medicine, philosophy, neurology, and psychopathology.

He published numerous accounts of cases, both in the academic press and the popular press. His most famous case was that of Christine Beauchamp, detailed in The Dissociation of a Personality (1906), which caused some consternation, due both to the sensational nature of the cases presented and to the convoluted prose style: "There was over her spine a 'hypnogenetic point', pressure upon which always caused a thrill to run through her that weakened her will and induced hypnotic sleep".

Not only was Morton Prince the founder of the Journal of Abnormal (and Social) Psychology, but he was also the founder of the American Psychopathological Association, and of the Harvard Psychological Clinic.

Prince maintained an active academic and professional life, not only with his psychopathologic studies but as practicing physician as well. He served from 1902 to 1912 as the second chairman of both the departments of psychiatry and neurology at Tufts University School of Medicine. He was a prolific writer, publishing some 14 books and numerous essays. He wrote mostly on dissociation and abnormal psychology but also applied his understanding of the unconscious to the politics of his day. Though his psychological ideas never took hold, he remained an eminent figure, Carl Jung for example contributing to his festschrift of 1925, Problems of Personality: Studies Presented to Dr. Morton Prince. Prince founded the Harvard Psychological Clinic in 1927, only two years before his death. That clinic established a major American stronghold for wide-ranging psychological researches into personality that included a number of the luminaries of that field (Henry Murray, Gordon Allport, and Robert W. White), who all became famous extending the ideas that Prince first taught them.

Prince was like many prominent men of psychological science at the turn of the 20th century who have become obscure. They were captivated by the new science of mental life that attempted to wrestle psychopathology from the clutches of moralism that deemed it a degeneracy or from medicine that saw a heredity degeneracy, but had not yet developed an overarching theory. Prince stressed the importance of the subconscious to hysterical symptoms at the same time as Freud, but he was critical of psychoanalysis – arguing to Putnam for example that "You are raising a cult not a science" – and preferred to outline his idiosyncratic position that never became popular. His groundbreaking work on personality became famous via Henry Murray, who took over as director of the Clinic and worked on elaborating it into a more systematic and approachable manner.

== Skepticism ==
Prince was skeptical of paranormal claims and believed such experiences could be explained psychologically (see anomalistic psychology). He was an early member of the American Society for Psychical Research and a long-standing member of the Society for Psychical Research. He was one of the first researchers to make a scientific study of crystal gazing.

== Selected publications ==
- Prince, M. (1885). The Nature of Mind and Human Automatism. Philadelphia, Lippincott.
- Prince, M. (1906). The Dissociation of a Personality. New York: Longmans, Green, & Co. Second edition (1908)
- Prince, M. (1909). Psychotherapeutics: A Symposium. Boston: R. G. Badge.
- Prince, M. (1909). My Life as a Dissociated Personality Prince, M (Ed.). Boston: R. G. Badger.
- Prince, M. (1915). The Psychology of the Kaiser: A Study of his Sentiments and his Obsessions London: Unwin Ltd.
- Prince, M. (1915). The Unconscious: The Fundamentals of Human Personality, Normal and Abnormal. New York, Macmillan.
- Prince, M. (1929). Clinical and Experimental Studies in Personality. Cambridge, Massachusetts: Sci-Art.
- Prince, M. (1975). Psychotherapy and Multiple Personality: Selected Essays. Hale, Jr., N. G. (Ed.). Cambridge, Massachusetts: Harvard University Press. ISBN 0-674-72225-6

== See also ==
- Alfred Binet
