= Bernard Hart =

English physician and psychiatrist

- Born: 24 March 1879; London
- Died: 16 March 1966 (aged 87); Eastbourne, Sussex
- Occupation: Psychiatrist

Bernard Hart CBE FRCP (24 March 1879 – 16 March 1966) was a British physician and psychiatrist.

After secondary education at University College School, Hampstead, and undergraduate education at University College London, Bernard Hart graduated from University College Hospital Medical School with the Conjoint diploma of LRCP, MRCS in 1903, MB in 1904, and MD in 1912. After qualifying in 1903, he held house appointments at the East London Hospital for Children, and then studied psychiatry in Paris and Zurich. After working as an assistant physician at the Hertfordshire County Asylum, otherwise known as Hill End Hospital at St Albans, and at Long Grove Asylum in Epsom, he was appointed in 1913 as the first physician for psychological medicine at University College Hospital.

At the beginning of WWI he joined the RAMC with the rank of major and served as lecturer in mental disease at Moss Side Military Hospital, Maghull, where veterans with shell-shock were treated. He was also physician to the Special Neurological Hospital for Officers at 10 Palace Green, Kensington, West London, as well as psychiatric consultant to other military hospitals in London.

After the end of WWI, he returned to University College Hospital and also joined the staff of the National Hospital for Diseases of the Nervous System including Paralysis and Epilepsy, Queen Square, London, and the staff of the Maudsley Hospital in south London. Upon the founding of The Journal of Neurology and Psychopathology in 1920, he was one of the nine members of the editorial committee, headed by Samuel Alexander Kinnier Wilson.

Hart's 1910 paper The conception of the subconscious introduced the works of Janet and Freud to English-speaking psychologists. In 1925 he was elected FRCP. In 1926 he delivered the Goulstonian Lectures on The Development of Psychopathology and its Place in Medicine.

During the second world war he was chief adviser on psychiatric matters to the Emergency Medical Service, working in close partnership with Gordon Holmes. He was appointed CBE in 1945 in recognition of this work. Two years later he retired and went to live at Eastbourne.

In 1912 in the Strand area of Central London, Hart married Mabel E. Spark. He was a member of the Savile Club. His outdoor recreations were mountaineering and skiing.

== Selected publications ==
- Hart, Bernard (1910). "The conception of the subconscious". The Journal of Abnormal Psychology. 4 (6): 351–371. doi:10.1037/h0074022.
- with Charles Spearman: Hart, Bernard; Spearman, C. (1912). "General ability, its existence and nature". British Journal of Psychology. 5 (1): 51–84. doi:10.1111/j.2044-8295.1912.tb00055.x.
- The psychology of insanity. Cambridge manuals of science and literature. Cambridge University Press. 1912. Hart, Bernard (1922). 1922 reprint of 1916 3rd edition.
- Hart, B. (1916). "The psychology of rumour". Proc R Soc Med. 9(Sect Psych) (Sect Psych): 1–26. PMC 2017115. PMID 19979445.
- The modern treatment of mental & nervous disorders: a lecture delivered at the University of Manchester, on 25th March 1918. Manchester University lectures; no. 21. Manchester University Press. 1918.
- Psychopathology, its development and its place in medicine. Cambridge University Press. 1927. Hart, Bernard (14 November 2013). 2013 pbk reprint of 1929 2nd edition. Cambridge University Press. ISBN 9781107693647.
