= Knafo =

Knafo is a surname. Notable people with the surname include:

- Anat Knafo (born 1963), Israeli politician
- Ariel Knafo-Noam, Israeli developmental psychologist
- Avi Knafo (born 1982), Israeli footballer
- Danielle Knafo, American clinical psychologist, psychoanalyst, and author
- Julien Knafo, Canadian composer and film director
- Sarah Knafo (born 1993), French magistrate, civil servant, author and political activist
- Vicki Knafo (born 1960), Israeli social activist
