= Robert D. Hare =

Canadian psychologist

Robert D. Hare CM
- Born: 1 January 1934 (age 92); Calgary, Alberta, Canada
- Education: University of Alberta (BA. MA); University of Western Ontario (PhD)
- Known for: Psychopathy Checklist
- Awards: Order of Canada; CPA Donald O. Hebb Award for Distinguished Contributions to Psychology as a Science; Bruno Klopfer Award
- Scientific career
- Fields: Criminal psychology
- Website: Hare.org

Robert D. Hare CM (born 1 January 1934) is a Canadian forensic psychologist, known for his research in the field of criminal psychology. He is a professor emeritus of the University of British Columbia where he specializes in psychopathology and psychophysiology.

Hare developed the Hare Psychopathy Checklist (PCL-Revised), used to assess cases of psychopathy. He advises the FBI's Child Abduction and Serial Murder Investigative Resources Center (CASMIRC) and consults for various British and North American prison services.

== Life and career ==
Hare was born on January 1, 1934, in Calgary, Alberta, Canada. Hare's father was a roofing contractor and his mother was of French Canadian descent. He grew up in a working-class neighborhood of Calgary. Hare attended the University of Alberta for a Bachelor of Arts degree which ended up 'more by default' with an emphasis on psychology. In 1959, he married Averil Hare whom he met in an abnormal psychology class, and a year later, their daughter, Cheryl, was born.

In 1960, Hare completed a Master of Arts in psychology at the University of Alberta. He then moved to the USA to study for a PhD program in psychophysiology at the University of Oregon, but due to his daughter falling ill the family returned to Canada. Hare then worked as the psychologist in the prison system in British Columbia (British Columbia Penitentiary) for eight months, an area in which he had no particular qualification or training; indeed he would later recount in Without Conscience that some prisoners were able to manipulate him. Hare then moved to London, Ontario, where he completed his PhD (1963) at the University of Western Ontario with a dissertation on the effects of punishment on behaviour. His research led him to The Mask of Sanity by American psychiatrist Hervey M. Cleckley, which played a pivotal role in the concept of psychopathy he applied and developed.

Hare then returned to Vancouver, British Columbia, working as a professor at the UBC's psychology department, where he would stay for 30 years until retirement, and undertaking research at the same prison he had previously worked in. He concluded that the reason some prisoners seemed not to change their behavior in response to punishment was because they were psychopaths. He recalls, "I happened to get into an area that nobody else was working in". Hare has said of himself and his wife Averil that family and the loss of family (their daughter Cheryl died from multiple sclerosis in 2003) "defines an awful lot about who Averil and I are." Averil, his wife, is a researcher and prominent social worker in Canada specializing in child abuse and child welfare.

In the 1970s he published Psychopathy: Theory and Research, summarizing the state of the field, and became internationally influential in reviving and shaping the concept.

Hare retired in 2000, closing his psychopathy research lab at the University of British Columbia. In 2010, he was awarded the Canadian Psychological Association's Donald O. Hebb Award for Distinguished Contributions to Psychology as a Science. The same year, he was named a member of the Order of Canada.

== Research ==
=== Causes of psychopathy ===
Hare's research on the causes of psychopathy focused initially on whether such persons show abnormal patterns of anticipation or response (such as low levels of anxiety or high impulsiveness) to aversive stimuli ('punishments' such as mild but painful electric shocks) or pleasant stimuli ('rewards', such as a slide of a naked body). Further, following Cleckley, Hare investigated whether the fundamental underlying pathology is a semantic affective deficit - an inability to understand or experience the full emotional meaning of life events. While establishing a range of idiosyncrasies in linguistic and affective processing under certain conditions, the research program has not confirmed a common pathology of psychopathy. Hare's contention that the pathology is likely due in large part to an inherited or 'hard wired' deficit in cerebral brain function remains speculative.

Hare has defined sociopathy as a condition distinct from psychopathy, caused by growing up in an antisocial or criminal subculture rather than being marked by a basic lack of social emotion or moral reasoning. He has also regarded the DSM-IV diagnosis of Antisocial Personality Disorder as separate to his concept of psychopathy, as it did not list the same underlying personality traits. He suggests that ASPD would cover several times more people than psychopathy, and that while the prevalence of sociopathy is not known it would likely cover considerably more people than ASPD.

=== Assessment tools ===
Frustrated by a lack of agreed definitions or rating systems of psychopathy, Hare began developing a Psychopathy Checklist. Produced for initial circulation in 1980, the same year that the DSM changed its diagnosis of sociopathic personality to antisocial personality disorder, it was based largely on the list of traits advanced by Cleckley, with whom Hare corresponded over the years. Hare redrafted the checklist in 1985 following Cleckley's death in 1984, renaming it the Hare Psychopathy Checklist Revised (PCL-R). It was finalised as a first edition in 1991, when it was also made available to the criminal justice system, which Hare says he did despite concerns that it was not designed for use outside of controlled experimental research. It was updated with extra data in a 2nd edition in 2003.

The PCL-R was reviewed in Buros Mental Measurements Yearbook (1995), as being the "state of the art" both clinically and in research use. In 2005, the Buros Mental Measurements Yearbook review listed the PCL-R as "a reliable and effective instrument for the measurement of psychopathy" and is considered the 'gold standard' for measurement of psychopathy. However, it is also criticised.

Hare has accused the DSM's ASPD diagnosis of 'drifting' from clinical tradition, but his own checklist has been accused of in reality being closer to the concept of criminologists William and Joan McCord than that of Cleckley; Hare himself, while noting his promotion of Cleckley's work for four decades, has distanced himself somewhat from Cleckley's work.

Hare is also co-author of derivatives of the PCL: the Psychopathy Checklist: Screening Version (PCL:SV) (still requires a clinical interview and review of records by a trained clinician), the P-Scan (P for psychopathy, a screening questionnaire for non-clinicians to detect possible psychopathy), the Psychopathy Checklist: Youth Version (PCL:YV) (to assess youth and children exhibiting early signs of psychopathy), and the Antisocial Process Screening Device (originally the Psychopathy Screening Device; a questionnaire for parents/staff to fill out on youth, or in a version developed by others, for youth to fill out as self-report). Hare is also a co-author of the Guidelines for a Psychopathy Treatment Program. He has also co-developed the 'B-Scan' questionnaires for people to rate psychopathy traits in others in the workplace.

Hare was involved in a controversy in 2010 in which he threatened legal action if a peer-reviewed psychology article on the PCL was published that he claimed misrepresented his views. The paper eventually was published after a three-year delay.

=== Impact ===
The Hare Psychopathy Checklist-Revised is sometimes used as a standard instrument for researchers and clinicians, especially in forensic settings such as prisons or high secure psychiatric units. The measures play an important role in recent risk-for-violence instruments. The PCL-R and PCL:SV have been found to be strong predictors of recidivism, violence and response to therapeutic intervention, though some studies have attributed this largely to the inclusion in the measure of past offending history.

The ability of Hare's concept of psychopathy to explain or predict crime has also been criticised, for example by Glenn D. Walters a long-serving US forensic clinical psychologist and Associate Professor of Criminal Justice.

== Popular science ==
Hare wrote a popular science bestseller published in 1993 titled Without Conscience: The Disturbing World of the Psychopaths Among Us (reissued 1999). He describes psychopaths as 'social predators', while pointing out that most don't commit murder. One philosophical review described it as having a high moral tone yet tending towards sensationalism and graphic anecdotes, and as providing a useful summary of the assessment of psychopathy but ultimately avoiding the difficult questions regarding internal contradictions in the concept or how it should be classified.

Hare also co-authored the bestselling Snakes in Suits: When Psychopaths Go to Work (2006) with organizational psychologist and human resources consultant Paul Babiak, a portrayal of the disruptions caused when psychopaths enter the workplace. The book focuses on what Hare refers to as the "successful psychopath", who can be charming and socially skilled and therefore able to get by in the workplace. This is by contrast with the type of psychopath whose lack of social skills or self-control would cause them to rely on threats and coercion and who would probably not be able to hold down a job for long.

Hare appeared in the 2003/4 award-winning documentary film The Corporation, discussing whether his criteria for psychopathy could be said to apply to modern business as a legal personality, appearing to conclude that many of them would apply by definition. However, in a 2007 edition of Snakes in Suits, Hare contends that the filmmakers took his remarks out of context and that he does not believe most corporations would meet all the necessary criteria in practice.

Hare's views are recounted with some skepticism in the 2011 bestseller The Psychopath Test by British investigative journalist Jon Ronson, to which Hare has responded.

Hare served as a consultant for Jacob M. Appel's Mask of Sanity (2017), a novel about a high-functioning sociopath.

== See also ==
- History of psychopathy
- Evil Genes
- The Psychopath Test
- Frank Ochberg
