= Altruism =

Concern for the well-being of others

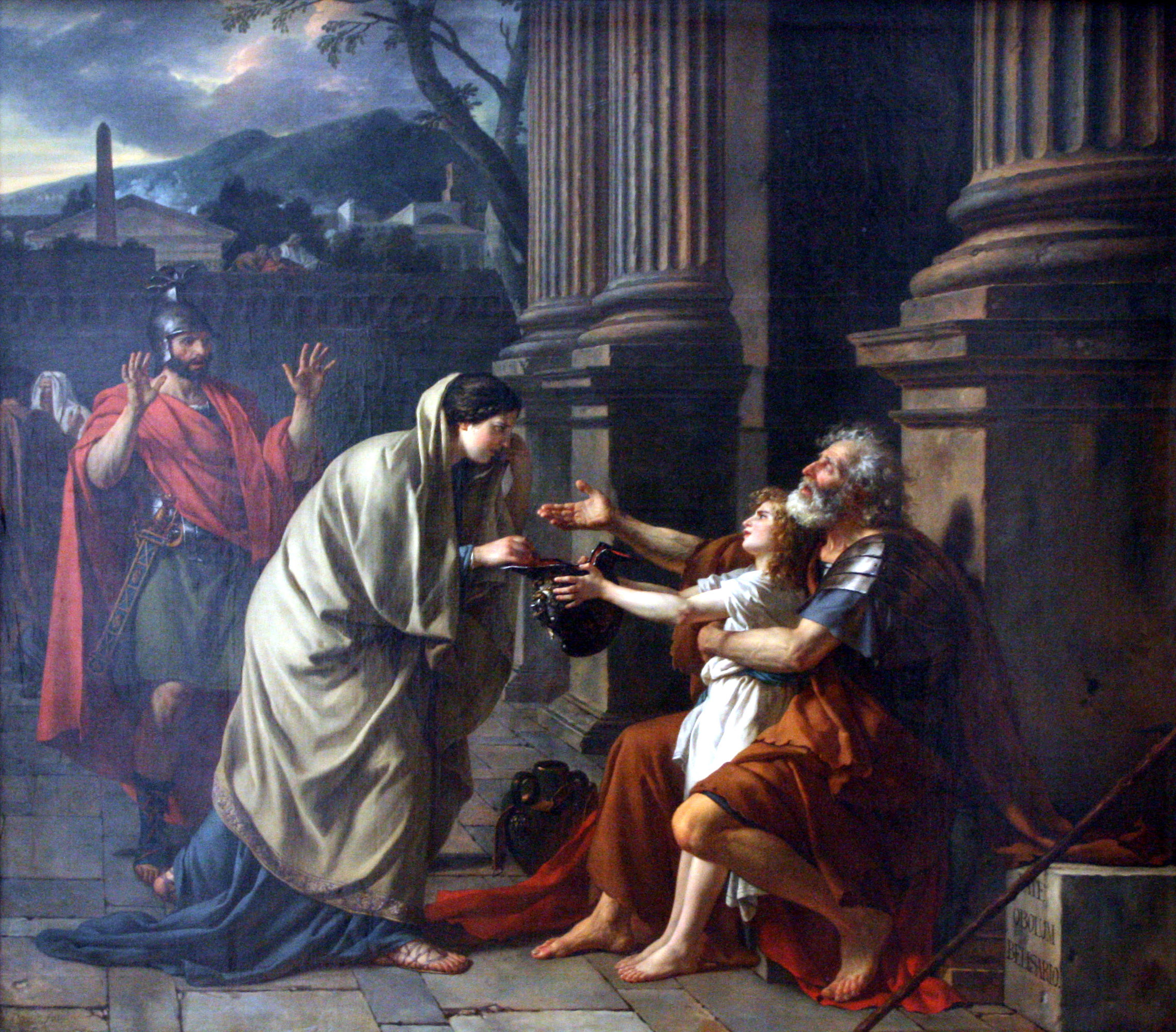
Giving alms to the poor is often considered an altruistic action.

Altruism is concern for the well-being and life of others independently of personal benefit or reciprocity.

The word altruism was popularised (and possibly coined) by the French philosopher Auguste Comte (1798–1857) c. 1830 in French, as altruisme, as an antonym of egoism. He derived it from the Italian altrui, which in turn was derived from Latin alteri, meaning "other people" or "somebody else". Altruism may be considered a synonym of selflessness, the opposite of self-centeredness.

Altruism is an important moral value in many cultures, ideologies, and religions. It can expand beyond care for humans to include consideration for other sentient beings and future generations.

Altruism in biology, as observed in populations of organisms, is when an individual performs an action at a cost to itself (in terms of e.g. pleasure and quality of life, time, probability of survival or reproduction) that benefits, directly or indirectly, another individual, without the expectation of reciprocity or compensation for that action.

The theory of psychological egoism suggests that no act of sharing, helping, or sacrificing can be "truly" altruistic, as the actor may receive an intrinsic reward in the form of personal gratification. The validity of this argument depends on whether such intrinsic rewards qualify as "benefits".

The term altruism can also refer to a deontological ethical doctrine that claims that individuals are morally obliged to benefit others. Used in this sense, it is usually contrasted with deontological egoism, which claims individuals are morally obligated to serve themselves first.

Effective altruism is the use of evidence and reason to determine the most effective ways to benefit others.

== The notion of altruism ==
The concept of altruism has a history in philosophical and ethical thought. The term was coined in the 19th century by the founding sociologist and philosopher of science Auguste Comte, and has become a major topic for psychologists (especially evolutionary psychology researchers), evolutionary biologists, and ethologists. Whilst ideas about altruism from one field can affect the other fields, the different methods and focuses of these fields always lead to different perspectives on altruism. In simple terms, altruism is caring about the welfare of other people and acting to help them, above oneself.

=== Cross-cultural perspectives on altruism ===
Cross-cultural perspectives on altruism show that how we view and experience helping others depends heavily on where we come from. In individualistic cultures, like many Western countries, acts of altruism often bring personal joy and satisfaction, as they align with values that emphasize individual achievement and self-fulfillment. On the other hand, in collectivist cultures, common in many Eastern societies, altruism is often seen as a responsibility to the group rather than a personal choice. This difference means that people in collectivist cultures might not feel the same personal happiness from helping others, as the act is more about fulfilling social obligations. Ultimately, these variations highlight how deeply cultural norms shape the way we approach and experience altruism.

== Scientific viewpoints ==
=== Anthropology ===
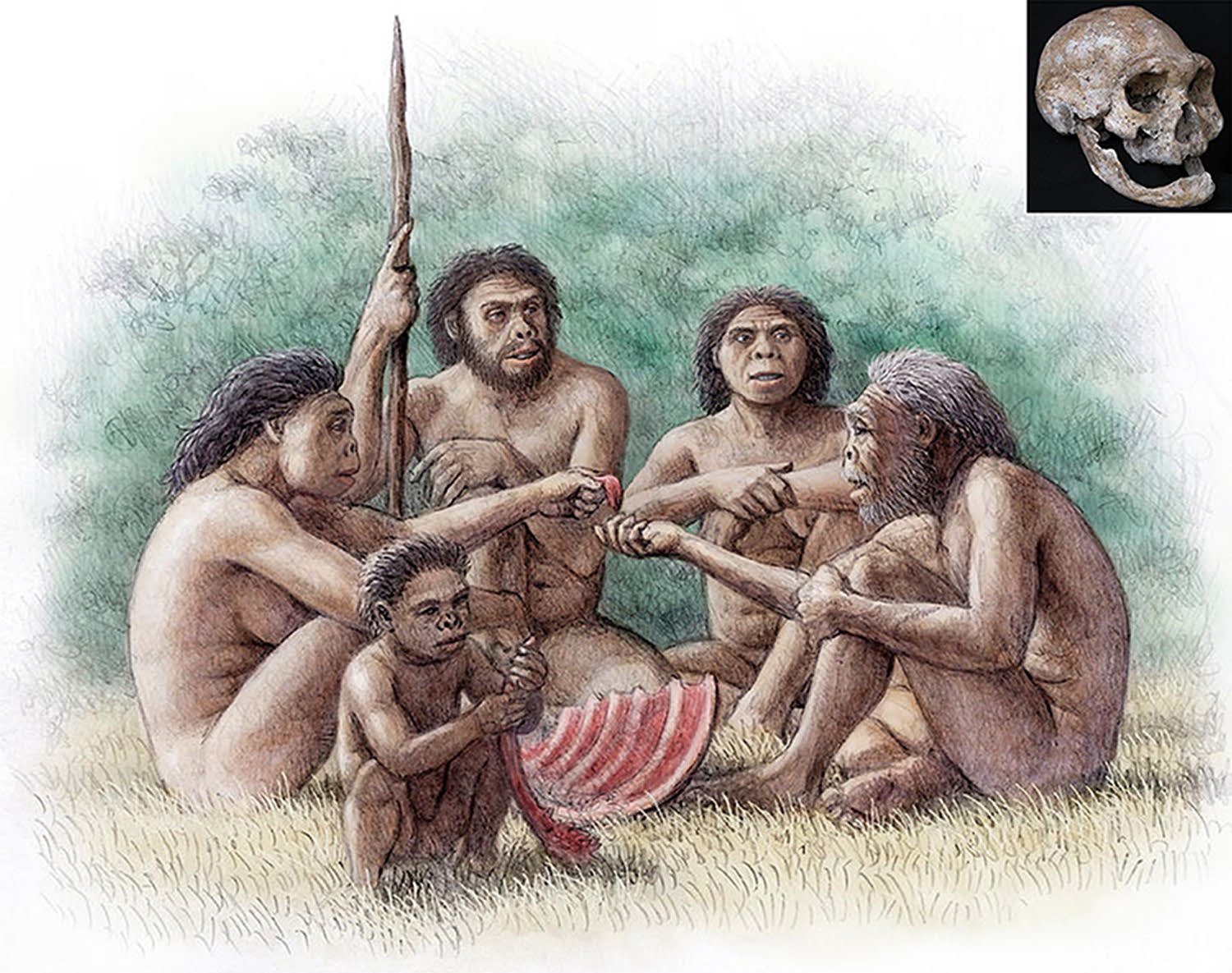
An old Homo erectus who survived for years without teeth probably through its group sharing their food is regarded as an early example of altruism.

Marcel Mauss's essay The Gift contains a passage called "Note on alms". This note describes the evolution of the notion of alms (and by extension of altruism) from the notion of sacrifice. In it, he writes:

Alms are the fruits of a moral notion of the gift and of fortune on the one hand, and of a notion of sacrifice, on the other. Generosity is an obligation, because Nemesis avenges the poor and the gods for the superabundance of happiness and wealth of certain people who should rid themselves of it. This is the ancient morality of the gift, which has become a principle of justice. The gods and the spirits accept that the share of wealth and happiness that has been offered to them and had been hitherto destroyed in useless sacrifices should serve the poor and children.

Egyptian sacred text from the 2nd century BC states that a person must feed the hungry, give drink to the thirsty, and clothe the naked in order to have a peaceful passage to the afterlife.

=== Evolutionary explanations ===
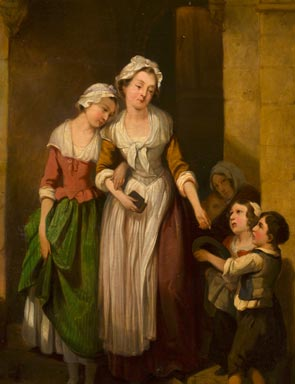
Giving alms to beggar children

In ethology (the scientific study of animal behaviour), and more generally in the study of social evolution, altruism refers to behavior by an individual that increases the fitness of another individual while decreasing the fitness of the actor. In evolutionary psychology, this term may be applied to a wide range of human behaviors such as charity, emergency aid, help to coalition partners, tipping, courtship gifts, production of public goods, and environmentalism.

The need for an explanation of altruistic behavior that is compatible with evolutionary origins has driven the development of new theories. Two related strands of research on altruism have emerged from traditional evolutionary analyses and evolutionary game theory: a mathematical model and analysis of behavioral strategies.

Some of the proposed mechanisms are:

- Kin selection. That humans and other animals are more altruistic towards close kin than to distant kin and non-kin has been confirmed in numerous studies across many different cultures. Even subtle cues indicating kinship may unconsciously increase altruistic behavior. One kinship cue is facial resemblance. One study found that slightly altering photographs to resemble the faces of study participants more closely increased the trust the participants expressed regarding depicted persons. Another cue is having the same family name, especially if rare, which has been found to increase helpful behavior. Another study found more cooperative behavior, the greater the number of perceived kin in a group. Using kinship terms in political speeches increased audience agreement with the speaker in one study. This effect was powerful for firstborns, who are typically close to their families.
- Vested interests. People are likely to suffer if their friends, allies and those from similar social ingroups suffer or disappear. Helping such group members may, therefore, also benefit the altruist. Making ingroup membership more noticeable increases cooperativeness. Extreme self-sacrifice towards the ingroup may be adaptive if a hostile outgroup threatens the entire ingroup.
- Reciprocal altruism. See also Reciprocity (evolution).
  - Direct reciprocity. Research shows that it can be beneficial to help others if there is a chance that they will reciprocate the help. The effective tit for tat strategy is one game theoretic example. Many people seem to be following a similar strategy by cooperating if and only if others cooperate in return.
    One consequence is that people are more cooperative with one another if they are more likely to interact again in the future. People tend to be less cooperative if they perceive that the frequency of helpers in the population is lower. They tend to help less if they see non-cooperativeness by others, and this effect tends to be stronger than the opposite effect of seeing cooperative behaviors. Simply changing the cooperative framing of a proposal may increase cooperativeness, such as calling it a "Community Game" instead of a "Wall Street Game".
    A tendency towards reciprocity implies that people feel obligated to respond if someone helps them. This has been used by charities that give small gifts to potential donors hoping to induce reciprocity. Another method is to announce publicly that someone has given a large donation. The tendency to reciprocate can even generalize, so people become more helpful toward others after being helped. On the other hand, people will avoid or even retaliate against those perceived not to be cooperating. People sometimes mistakenly fail to help when they intended to, or their helping may not be noticed, which may cause unintended conflicts. As such, it may be an optimal strategy to be slightly forgiving of and have a slightly generous interpretation of non-cooperation.
    People are more likely to cooperate on a task if they can communicate with one another first. This may be due to better cooperativeness assessments or promises exchange. They are more cooperative if they can gradually build trust instead of being asked to give extensive help immediately. Direct reciprocity and cooperation in a group can be increased by changing the focus and incentives from intra-group competition to larger-scale competitions, such as between groups or against the general population. Thus, giving grades and promotions based only on an individual's performance relative to a small local group, as is common, may reduce cooperative behaviors in the group.
  - Indirect reciprocity. Because people avoid poor reciprocators and cheaters, a person's reputation is important. A person esteemed for their reciprocity is more likely to receive assistance, even from individuals they have not directly interacted with before.
  - Strong reciprocity. This form of reciprocity is expressed by people who invest more resources in cooperation and punishment than what is deemed optimal based on established theories of altruism.
  - Pseudo-reciprocity. An organism behaves altruistically and the recipient does not reciprocate but has an increased chance of acting in a way that is selfish but also as a byproduct benefits the altruist.
- Costly signaling and the handicap principle. Altruism, by diverting resources from the altruist, can act as an "honest signal" of available resources and the skills to acquire them. This may signal to others that the altruist is a valuable potential partner. It may also signal interactive and cooperative intentions, since someone who does not expect to interact further in the future gains nothing from such costly signaling. While it's uncertain if costly signaling can predict long-term cooperative traits, people tend to trust helpers more. Costly signaling loses its value when everyone shares identical traits, resources, and cooperative intentions, but it gains significance as population variability in these aspects increases.

Hunters who share meat display a costly signal of ability. The research found that good hunters have higher reproductive success and more adulterous relations even if they receive no more of the hunted meat than anyone else. Similarly, holding large feasts and giving large donations are ways of demonstrating one's resources. Heroic risk-taking has also been interpreted as a costly signal of ability.

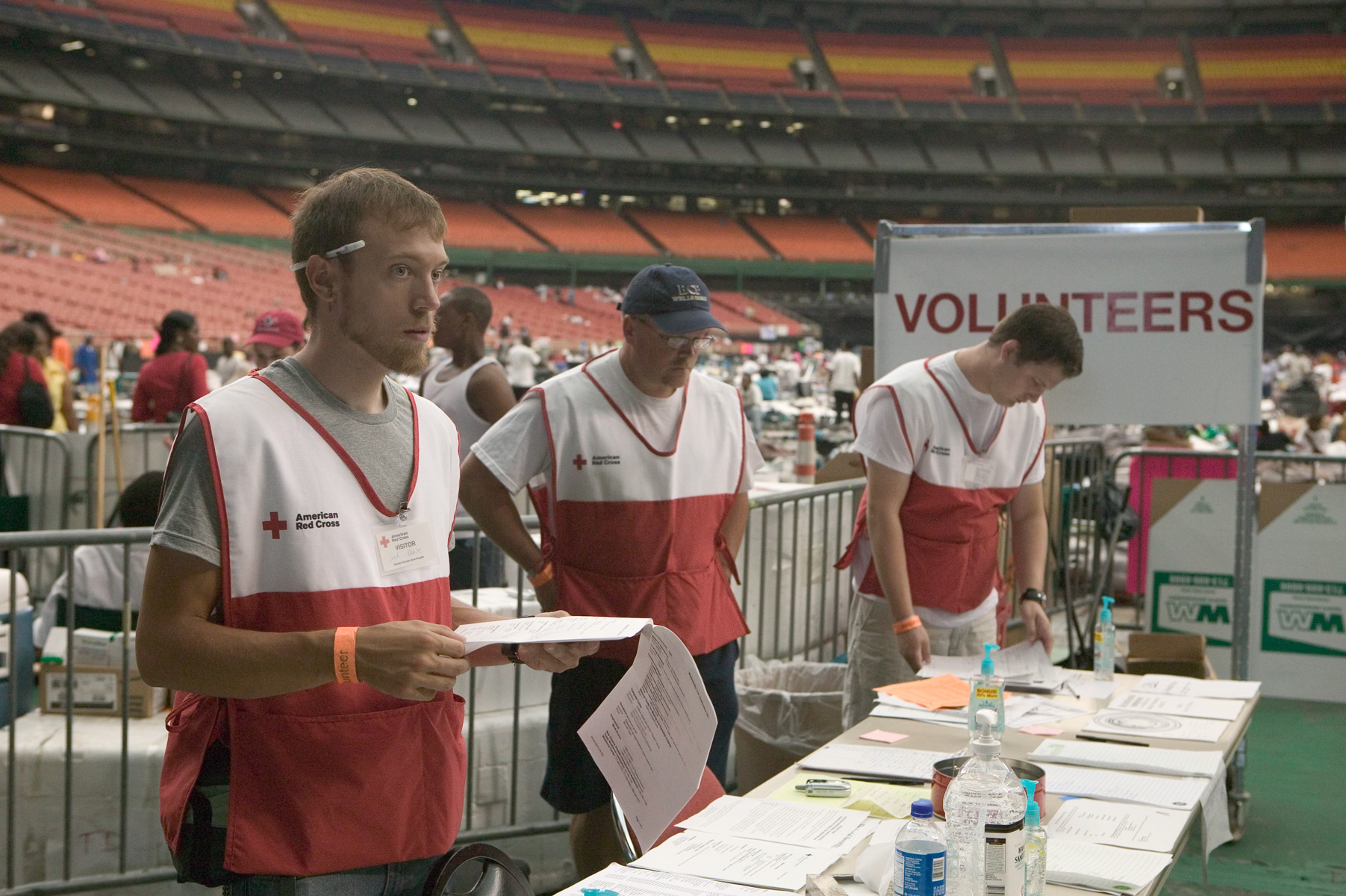
Volunteers assist Hurricane victims at the Houston Astrodome, following Hurricane Katrina.

Both indirect reciprocity and costly signaling depend on reputation value and tend to make similar predictions. One is that people will be more helpful when they know that their helping behavior will be communicated to people they will interact with later, publicly announced, discussed, or observed by someone else. This has been documented in many studies. The effect is sensitive to subtle cues, such as people being more helpful when there were stylized eyespots instead of a logo on a computer screen. Weak reputational cues such as eyespots may become unimportant if there are stronger cues present and may lose their effect with continued exposure unless reinforced with real reputational effects. Public displays such as public weeping for dead celebrities and participation in demonstrations may be influenced by a desire to be seen as generous. People who know that they are publicly monitored sometimes even wastefully donate the money they know is not needed by the recipient because of reputational concerns.

Typically, women find altruistic men to be attractive partners. When women look for a long-term partner, altruism may be a trait they prefer as it may indicate that the prospective partner is also willing to share resources with her and her children. Men perform charitable acts in the early stages of a romantic relationship or simply when in the presence of an attractive woman. While both sexes state that kindness is the most preferable trait in a partner, there is some evidence that men place less value on this than women and that women may not be more altruistic in the presence of an attractive man. Men may even avoid altruistic women in short-term relationships, which may be because they expect less success.

People may compete for the social benefit of a burnished reputation, which may cause competitive altruism. On the other hand, in some experiments, a proportion of people do not seem to care about reputation and do not help more, even if this is conspicuous. This may be due to reasons such as psychopathy or that they are so attractive that they need not be seen as altruistic. The reputational benefits of altruism occur in the future compared to the immediate costs of altruism. While humans and other organisms generally place less value on future costs/benefits as compared to those in the present, some have shorter time horizons than others, and these people tend to be less cooperative.

Explicit extrinsic rewards and punishments have sometimes been found to have a counterintuitively inverse effect on behaviors when compared to intrinsic rewards. This may be because such extrinsic incentives may replace (partially or in whole) intrinsic and reputational incentives, motivating the person to focus on obtaining the extrinsic rewards, which may make the thus-incentivized behaviors less desirable. People prefer altruism in others when it appears to be due to a personality characteristic rather than overt reputational concerns; simply pointing out that there are reputational benefits of action may reduce them. This may be used as a derogatory tactic against altruists ("you're just virtue signalling"), especially by those who are non-cooperators. A counterargument is that doing good due to reputational concerns is better than doing no good.

- Group selection. It has controversially been argued by some evolutionary scientists such as David Sloan Wilson that natural selection can act at the level of non-kin groups to produce adaptations that benefit a non-kin group, even if these adaptations are detrimental at the individual level. Thus, while altruistic persons may under some circumstances be outcompeted by less altruistic persons at the individual level, according to group selection theory, the opposite may occur at the group level where groups consisting of the more altruistic persons may outcompete groups consisting of the less altruistic persons. Such altruism may only extend to ingroup members while directing prejudice and antagonism against outgroup members (see also in-group favoritism). Many other evolutionary scientists have criticized group selection theory.

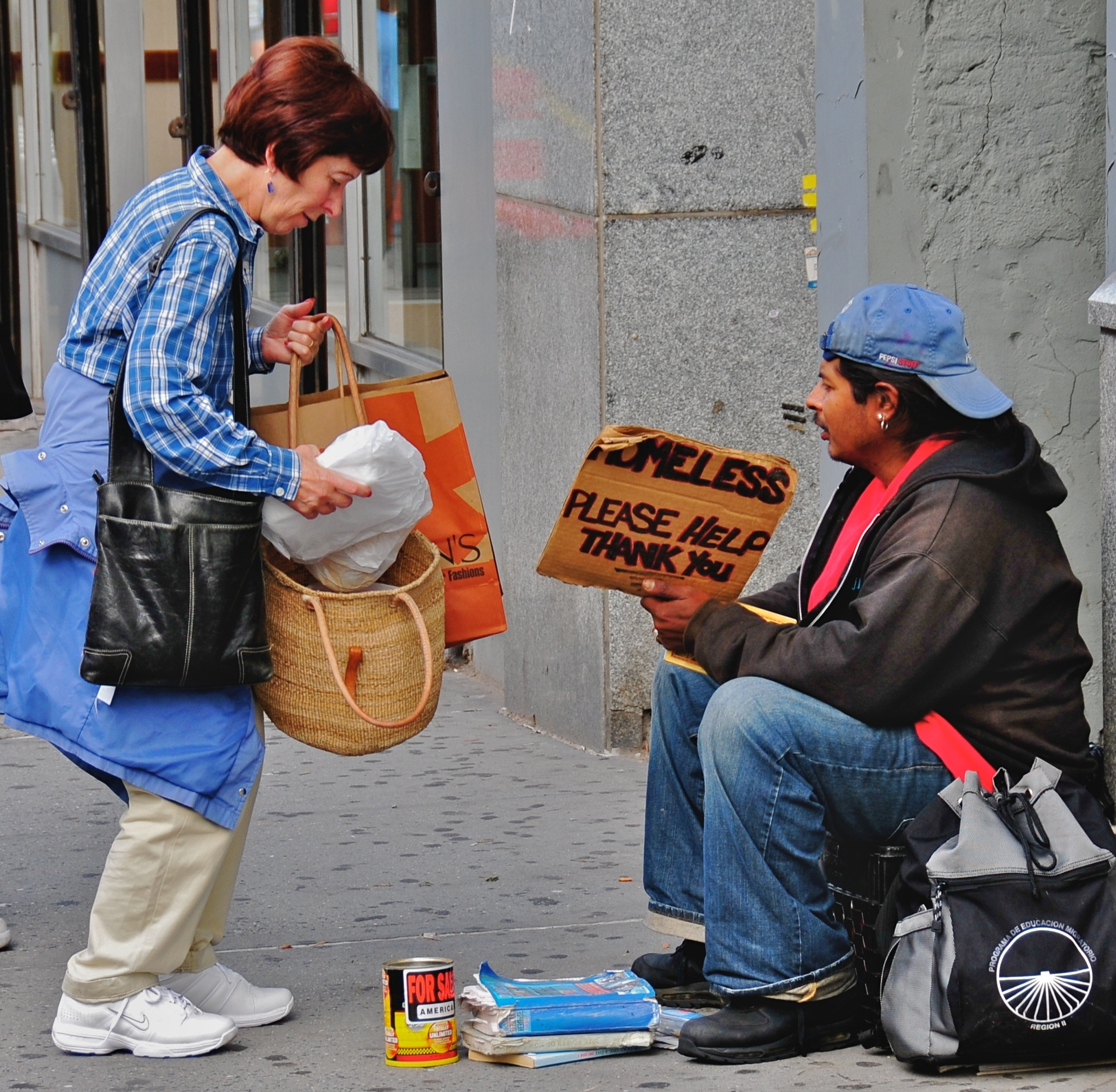
Helping the homeless in New York City

Such explanations do not imply that humans consciously calculate how to increase their inclusive fitness when doing altruistic acts. Instead, evolution has shaped psychological mechanisms, such as emotions, that promote certain altruistic behaviors.

The benefits for the altruist may be increased, and the costs reduced by being more altruistic towards certain groups. Research has found that people are more altruistic to kin than to no-kin, to friends than strangers, to those attractive than to those unattractive, to non-competitors than competitors, and to members in-groups than to members of out-groups.

The study of altruism was the initial impetus behind George R. Price's development of the Price equation, a mathematical equation used to study genetic evolution. An interesting example of altruism is found in the cellular slime moulds, such as Dictyostelium mucoroides. These protists live as individual amoebae until starved, at which point they aggregate and form a multicellular fruiting body in which some cells sacrifice themselves to promote the survival of other cells in the fruiting body.

Selective investment theory proposes that close social bonds, and associated emotional, cognitive, and neurohormonal mechanisms, evolved to facilitate long-term, high-cost altruism between those closely depending on one another for survival and reproductive success.

Such cooperative behaviors have sometimes been seen as arguments for left-wing politics, for example, by the Russian zoologist and anarchist Peter Kropotkin in his 1902 book Mutual Aid: A Factor of Evolution and moral philosopher Peter Singer in his book A Darwinian Left.

=== Neurobiology ===
Jorge Moll, Frank Krueger, Jordan Grafman, and collaborators, provided the first evidence for the neural bases of altruistic giving in normal healthy volunteers, using functional magnetic resonance imaging. In their research, they showed that both pure monetary rewards and charitable donations activated the mesolimbic reward pathway, a primitive part of the brain that usually responds to food and sex. However, when volunteers generously placed the interests of others before their own by making charitable donations, another brain circuit was also selectively activated: the subgenual cortex/septal region. These structures are related to social attachment and bonding in other species. The experiment suggested that altruism is not a higher moral faculty overpowering innate selfish desires, but a fundamental, ingrained, and enjoyable trait in the brain. One brain region, the subgenual anterior cingulate cortex/basal forebrain, contributes to learning altruistic behavior, especially in people with a propensity for empathy.

Bill Harbaugh, a University of Oregon economist, in an fMRI scanner test conducted with his psychologist colleague Dr. Ulrich Mayr, reached the same conclusions as Jorge Moll and Jordan Grafman about giving to charity, although they were able to divide the study group into two groups: "egoists" and "altruists". One of their discoveries was that, though rarely, even some of the considered "egoists" sometimes gave more than expected because that would help others, leading to the conclusion that there are other factors in charity, such as a person's environment and values.

A recent meta-analysis of fMRI studies conducted by Shawn Rhoads, Jo Cutler, and Abigail Marsh analyzed the results of prior studies of generosity in which participants could freely choose to give or not give resources to someone else. The results of this study confirmed that altruism is supported by distinct mechanisms from giving motivated by reciprocity or by fairness. This study also confirmed that the right ventral striatum is recruited during altruistic giving, as well as the ventromedial prefrontal cortex, bilateral anterior cingulate cortex, and bilateral anterior insula, which are regions previously implicated in empathy.

Abigail Marsh has conducted studies of real-world altruists that have also identified an important role for the amygdala in human altruism. In real-world altruists, such as people who have donated kidneys to strangers, the amygdala is larger than in typical adults. Altruists' amygdalas are also more responsive than those of typical adults to the sight of others' distress, which is thought to reflect an empathic response to distress. This structure may also be involved in altruistic choices due to its role in encoding the value of outcomes for others. This is consistent with the findings of research in non-human animals, which has identified neurons within the amygdala that specifically encode the value of others' outcomes, activity in which appears to drive altruistic choices in monkeys.

=== Psychology ===
The International Encyclopedia of the Social Sciences defines psychological altruism as "a motivational state to increase another's welfare". Psychological altruism is contrasted with psychological egoism, which refers to the motivation to increase one's welfare. In keeping with this, research in real-world altruists, including altruistic kidney donors, bone marrow donors, humanitarian aid workers, and heroic rescuers findings that these altruists are primarily distinguished from other adults by unselfish traits and decision-making patterns. This suggests that human altruism reflects genuinely high valuation of others' outcomes.

There has been some debate on whether humans are capable of psychological altruism. Some definitions specify a self-sacrificial nature to altruism and a lack of external rewards for altruistic behaviors. However, because altruism ultimately benefits the self in many cases, the selflessness of altruistic acts is difficult to prove. The social exchange theory postulates that altruism only exists when the benefits outweigh the costs to the self.

Daniel Batson, a psychologist, examined this question and argued against the social exchange theory. He identified four significant motives: to ultimately benefit the self (egoism), to ultimately benefit the other person (altruism), to benefit a group (collectivism), or to uphold a moral principle (principlism). Altruism that ultimately serves selfish gains is thus differentiated from selfless altruism, but the general conclusion has been that empathy-induced altruism can be genuinely selfless. The empathy-altruism hypothesis states that psychological altruism exists and is evoked by the empathic desire to help someone suffering. Feelings of empathic concern are contrasted with personal distress, which compels people to reduce their unpleasant emotions and increase their positive ones by helping someone in need. Empathy is thus not selfless since altruism works either as a way to avoid those negative, unpleasant feelings and have positive, pleasant feelings when triggered by others' need for help or as a way to gain social reward or avoid social punishment by helping. People with empathic concern help others in distress even when exposure to the situation could be easily avoided, whereas those lacking in empathic concern avoid allowing it unless it is difficult or impossible to avoid exposure to another's suffering.

Helping behavior is seen in humans from about two years old when a toddler can understand subtle emotional cues.

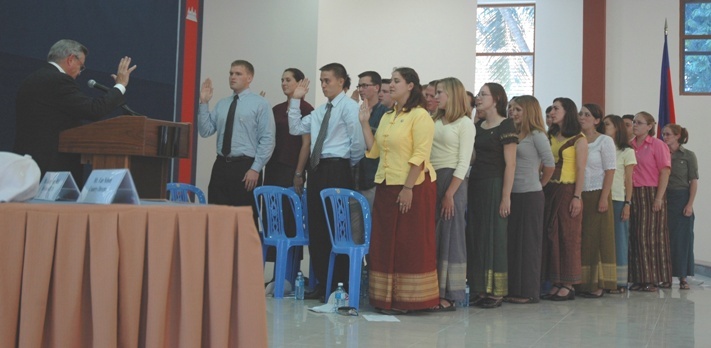
Peace Corps trainees swearing in as volunteers in Cambodia, 4 April 2007

In psychological research on altruism, studies often observe altruism as demonstrated through prosocial behaviors such as helping, comforting, sharing, cooperation, philanthropy, and community service. People are most likely to help if they recognize that a person is in need and feel personal responsibility for reducing the person's distress. The number of bystanders witnessing pain or suffering affects the likelihood of helping (the Bystander effect). More significant numbers of bystanders decrease individual feelings of responsibility. However, a witness with a high level of empathic concern is likely to assume personal responsibility entirely regardless of the number of bystanders.

Many studies have observed the effects of volunteerism (as a form of altruism) on happiness and health and have consistently found that those who exhibit volunteerism also have better current and future health and well-being. In a study of older adults, those who volunteered had higher life satisfaction and will to live, and less depression, anxiety, and somatization. Volunteerism and helping behavior have not only been shown to improve mental health but physical health and longevity as well, attributable to the activity and social integration it encourages. One study examined the physical health of mothers who volunteered over 30 years and found that 52% of those who did not belong to a volunteer organization experienced a major illness while only 36% of those who did volunteer experienced one. A study on adults aged 55 and older found that during the four-year study period, people who volunteered for two or more organizations had a 63% lower likelihood of dying. After controlling for prior health status, it was determined that volunteerism accounted for a 44% reduction in mortality. Merely being aware of kindness in oneself and others is also associated with greater well-being. A study that asked participants to count each act of kindness they performed for one week significantly enhanced their subjective happiness. Happier people are kinder and more grateful, kinder people are happier and more grateful and more grateful people are happier and kinder, the study suggests.

While research supports the idea that altruistic acts bring about happiness, it has also been found to work in the opposite direction—that happier people are also kinder. The relationship between altruistic behavior and happiness is bidirectional. Studies found that generosity increases linearly from sad to happy affective states.

Feeling over-taxed by the needs of others has negative effects on health and happiness. For example, one study on volunteerism found that feeling overwhelmed by others' demands had an even stronger negative effect on mental health than helping had a positive one (although positive effects were still significant).

Older humans were found to have higher altruism.

=== Genetics and environment ===
Both genetics and environment have been implicated in influencing pro-social or altruistic behavior. Candidate genes include OXTR (polymorphisms in the oxytocin receptor), CD38, COMT, DRD4, DRD5, IGF2, AVPR1A and GABRB2. It is theorized that some of these genes influence altruistic behavior by modulating levels of neurotransmitters such as serotonin and dopamine.

According to Christopher Boehm, altruistic behaviour evolved as a way of surviving within a group.

=== Sociology ===
"Sociologists have long been concerned with how to build the good society". The structure of our societies and how individuals come to exhibit charitable, philanthropic, and other pro-social, altruistic actions for the common good is a commonly researched topic within the field. The American Sociology Association (ASA) acknowledges public sociology saying, "The intrinsic scientific, policy, and public relevance of this field of investigation in helping to construct 'good societies' is unquestionable". This type of sociology seeks contributions that aid popular and theoretical understandings of what motivates altruism and how it is organized, and promotes an altruistic focus in order to benefit the world and people it studies.

How altruism is framed, organized, carried out, and what motivates it at the group level is an area of focus that sociologists investigate in order to contribute back to the groups it studies and "build the good society". The motivation of altruism is also the focus of study; for example, one study links the occurrence of moral outrage to altruistic compensation of victims. Studies show that generosity in laboratory and in online experiments is contagious – people imitate the generosity they observe in others.

== Religious viewpoints ==
Most, if not all, of the world's religions promote altruism as a very important moral value. Buddhism, Christianity, Hinduism, Islam, Jainism, Judaism, and Sikhism and others, place particular emphasis on altruistic morality.

=== Buddhism ===
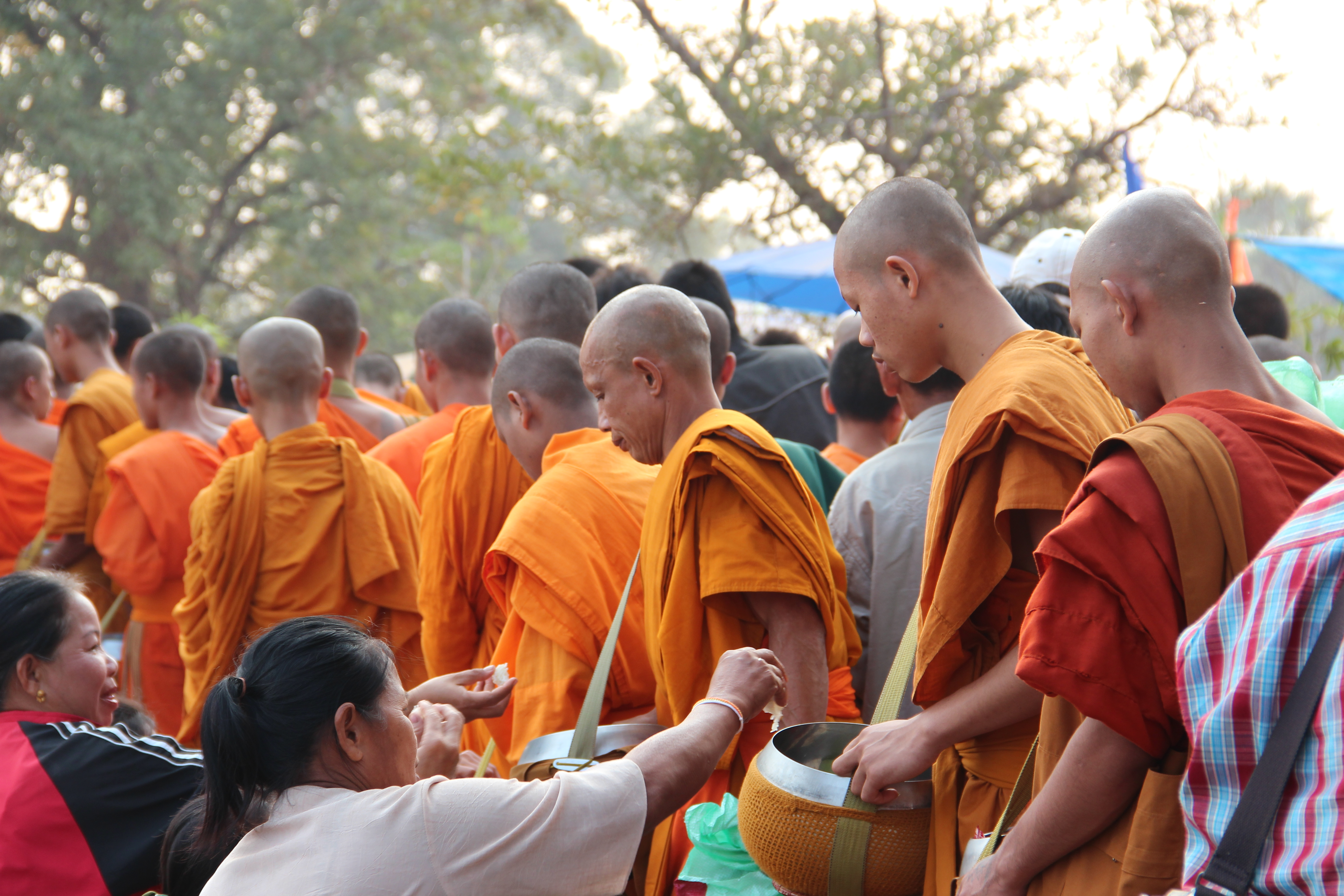
Monks collecting alms

Altruism figures prominently in Buddhism. Love and compassion are components of all forms of Buddhism, and are focused on all beings equally: love is the wish that all beings be happy, and compassion is the wish that all beings be free from suffering. "Many illnesses can be cured by the one medicine of love and compassion. These qualities are the ultimate source of human happiness, and the need for them lies at the very core of our being" (Dalai Lama).

The notion of altruism is modified in such a world-view, since the belief is that such a practice promotes the practitioner's own happiness: "The more we care for the happiness of others, the greater our own sense of well-being becomes" (Dalai Lama).

In Buddhism, a person's actions cause karma, which consists of consequences proportional to the moral implications of their actions. Deeds considered to be bad are punished, while those considered to be good are rewarded.

=== Christianity ===
Thomas Aquinas interprets the biblical phrase "You should love your neighbour as yourself" as meaning that love for ourselves is the exemplar of love for others. Considering that "the love with which a man loves himself is the form and root of friendship", he quotes Aristotle that "the origin of friendly relations with others lies in our relations to ourselves". Aquinas concluded that though we are not bound to love others more than ourselves, we naturally seek the common good, the good of the whole, more than any private good, the good of a part. However, he thought we should love God more than ourselves and our neighbours, and more than our bodily life—since the ultimate purpose of loving our neighbour is to share in eternal beatitude: a more desirable thing than bodily well-being. In coining the word "altruism", as stated above, Comte was probably opposing this Thomistic doctrine, which is present in some theological schools within Catholicism. The aim and focus of Christian life is a life that glorifies God, while obeying Christ's command to treat others equally, caring for them and understanding that eternity in heaven is what Jesus' Resurrection at Calvary was all about.

Many biblical authors draw a strong connection between love of others and love of God. 1 John 1:4 states that for one to love God one must love his fellow man, and that hatred of one's fellow man is the same as hatred of God. Thomas Jay Oord has argued in several books that altruism is but one possible form of love. An altruistic action is not always a loving action. Oord defines altruism as acting for the other's good, and he agrees with feminists who note that sometimes love requires acting for one's own good when the other's demands undermine overall well-being.

German philosopher Max Scheler distinguishes two ways in which the strong can help the weak. One way is a sincere expression of Christian love, "motivated by a powerful feeling of security, strength, and inner salvation, of the invincible fullness of one's own life and existence". Another way is merely "one of the many modern substitutes for love,... nothing but the urge to turn away from oneself and to lose oneself in other people's business". At its worst, Scheler says, "love for the small, the poor, the weak, and the oppressed is really disguised hatred, repressed envy, an impulse to detract, etc., directed against the opposite phenomena: wealth, strength, power, largesse."

=== Hinduism ===
In Hinduism, selflessness (Atmatyag), love (Prema), kindness (Daya), and forgiveness (Kshama) are considered as the highest acts of humanity or "Manushyattva". Giving alms to the beggars or poor people is considered as a divine act or "Punya" and Hindus believe it will free their souls from guilt or "Paapa" and will led them to heaven or "Swarga" in afterlife. Altruism is also the central act of various Hindu mythology and religious poems and songs. Mass donation of clothes to poor people (Vastraseva), or blood donation camp or mass food donation (Annaseva) for poor people is common in various Hindu religious ceremonies.

The Bhagavad Gita supports the doctrine of karma yoga (achieving oneness with God through action) and Nishkama Karma or action without expectation or desire for personal gain which can be said to encompass altruism. Altruistic acts are generally celebrated and well received in Hindu literature and are central to Hindu morality.

=== Islam ===
In the Arabic language, "'iythar" (إيثار) means "preferring others to oneself".

On the topic of donating blood to non-Muslims (a controversial topic within the faith), the Shia religious professor, Fadhil al-Milani has provided theological evidence that makes it positively justifiable. In fact, he considers it a form of religious sacrifice and ithar (altruism).

For Sufis, 'iythar means devotion to others through complete forgetfulness of one's own concerns, where concern for others is deemed as a demand made by God on the human body, considered to be property of God alone. The importance of 'iythar (also known as īthār) lies in sacrifice for the sake of the greater good; Islam considers those practicing īthār as abiding by the highest degree of nobility. This is similar to the notion of chivalry. A constant concern for God results in a careful attitude towards people, animals, and other things in this world.

=== Jainism ===
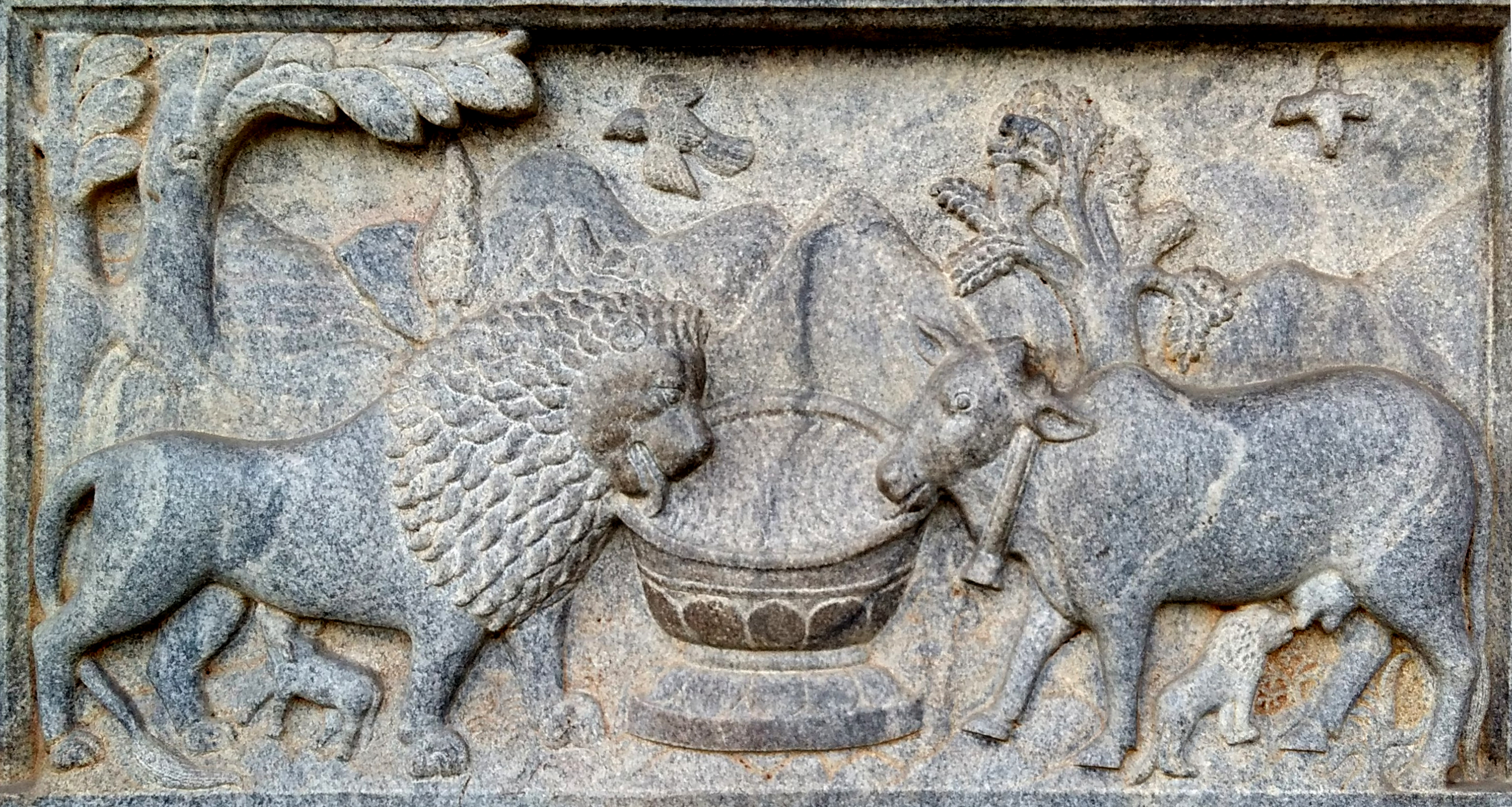
Sculpture depicting the Jain concept of ahimsa (non-injury)

The fundamental principles of Jainism revolve around altruism, not only for other humans but for all sentient beings. Jainism preaches ahimsa – to live and let live, not harming sentient beings, i.e. uncompromising reverence for all life. The first Tirthankara, Rishabhdev, introduced the concept of altruism for all living beings, from extending knowledge and experience to others to donation, giving oneself up for others, non-violence, and compassion for all living things.

The principle of nonviolence seeks to minimize karmas which limit the capabilities of the soul. Jainism views every soul as worthy of respect because it has the potential to become Siddha (God in Jainism). Because all living beings possess a soul, great care and awareness is essential in one's actions. Jainism emphasizes the equality of all life, advocating harmlessness towards all, whether the creatures are great or small. This policy extends even to microscopic organisms. Jainism acknowledges that every person has different capabilities and capacities to practice and therefore accepts different levels of compliance for ascetics and householders.

=== Judaism ===
Judaism defines altruism as the desired goal of creation. Rabbi Abraham Isaac Kook stated that love is the most important attribute in humanity. Love is defined as bestowal, or giving, which is the intention of altruism. This can be altruism towards humanity that leads to altruism towards the creator or God. Kabbalah defines God as the force of giving in existence. Rabbi Moshe Chaim Luzzatto focused on the "purpose of creation" and how the will of God was to bring creation into perfection and adhesion with this force of giving.

Modern Kabbalah developed by Rabbi Yehuda Ashlag, in his writings about the future generation, focuses on how society could achieve an altruistic social framework. Ashlag proposed that such a framework is the purpose of creation, and everything that happens is to raise humanity to the level of altruism, love for one another. Ashlag focused on society and its relation to divinity.

=== Sikhism ===
Altruism is essential to the Sikh religion. The central faith in Sikhism is that the greatest deed anyone can do is to imbibe and live the godly qualities such as love, affection, sacrifice, patience, harmony, and truthfulness. Sevā, or selfless service to the community for its own sake, is an important concept in Sikhism.

The fifth Guru, Guru Arjun, sacrificed his life to uphold "22 carats of pure truth, the greatest gift to humanity", according to the Guru Granth Sahib. The ninth Guru, Tegh Bahadur, sacrificed his life to protect weak and defenseless people against atrocity.

In the late seventeenth century, Guru Gobind Singh (the tenth Guru in Sikhism), was at war with the Mughal rulers to protect the people of different faiths when a fellow Sikh, Bhai Kanhaiya, attended the troops of the enemy. He gave water to both friends and foes who were wounded on the battlefield. Some of the enemy began to fight again and some Sikh warriors were annoyed by Bhai Kanhaiya as he was helping their enemy. Sikh soldiers brought Bhai Kanhaiya before Guru Gobind Singh, and complained of his action that they considered counterproductive to their struggle on the battlefield. "What were you doing, and why?" asked the Guru. "I was giving water to the wounded because I saw your face in all of them", replied Bhai Kanhaiya. The Guru responded, "Then you should also give them ointment to heal their wounds. You were practicing what you were coached in the house of the Guru."

Under the tutelage of the Guru, Bhai Kanhaiya subsequently founded a volunteer corps for altruism, which is still engaged today in doing good to others and in training new recruits for this service.

== Philosophy ==
There is a wide range of philosophical views on humans' obligations or motivations to act altruistically. Proponents of ethical altruism maintain that individuals are morally obligated to act altruistically. The opposing view is ethical egoism, which maintains that moral agents should always act in their own self-interest. Both ethical altruism and ethical egoism contrast with utilitarianism, which maintains that each agent should act in order to maximise the efficacy of their function and the benefit to both themselves and their co-inhabitants.

A related concept in descriptive ethics is psychological egoism, the thesis that humans always act in their own self-interest and that true altruism is impossible. Rational egoism is the view that rationality consists in acting in one's self-interest (without specifying how this affects one's moral obligations).

In his book I am You: The Metaphysical Foundations for Global Ethics, Daniel Kolak argues that open individualism provides a rational basis for altruism. According to Kolak, egoism is incoherent because the concept of a future self is incoherent, similar to the idea of anattā in Buddhist philosophy, and everyone is in reality the same being. Derek Parfit made similar arguments in the book Reasons and Persons, using thought experiments such as the teletransportation paradox to illustrate the philosophical problems with personal identity.

=== Effective altruism ===
Effective altruism is a philosophy and social movement that uses evidence and reasoning to determine the most effective ways to benefit others. Effective altruism encourages individuals to consider all causes and actions and to act in the way that brings about the greatest positive impact, based upon their values. It is the broad, evidence-based, and cause-neutral approach that distinguishes effective altruism from traditional altruism or charity. Effective altruism is part of the larger movement towards evidence-based practices.

While a substantial proportion of effective altruists have focused on the nonprofit sector, the philosophy of effective altruism applies more broadly to prioritizing the scientific projects, companies, and policy initiatives which can be estimated to save lives, help people, or otherwise have the biggest benefit. People associated with the movement include philosopher Peter Singer, Facebook co-founder Dustin Moskovitz, Cari Tuna, Oxford-based researchers William MacAskill and Toby Ord, and professional poker player Liv Boeree.

== Extreme altruism ==
=== Pathological altruism ===
Pathological altruism is altruism taken to an unhealthy extreme, such that it either harms the altruistic person or the person's well-intentioned actions cause more harm than good.

The term "pathological altruism" was popularised by the book Pathological Altruism.

Examples include depression and burnout seen in healthcare professionals, an unhealthy focus on others to the detriment of one's own needs, animal hoarding, and ineffective philanthropic and social programs that ultimately worsen the situations they are meant to aid.

Extreme altruism also known as costly altruism, extraordinary altruism, or heroic behaviours (shall be distinguished from heroism), refers to selfless acts directed to a stranger which significantly exceed the normal altruistic behaviours, often involving risks or great cost to the altruists themselves. Since acts of extreme altruism are often directed towards strangers, many commonly accepted models of simple altruism appear inadequate in explaining this phenomenon.

One of the initial concepts was introduced by Wilson in 1976, which he referred to as "hard-core" altruism. This form is characterised by impulsive actions directed towards others, typically a stranger and lacking incentives for reward. Since then, several papers have mentioned the possibility of such altruism.

In 21st century the progress in the field slowed down due to adopting ethical guidelines that restrict exposing research participants to costly or risky decisions (see Declaration of Helsinki). Consequently, much research has based their studies on living organ donations and the actions of Carnegie Hero medal recipients, actions which involve high risk, high cost, and are of infrequent occurrences. A typical example of extreme altruism would be non-directed kidney donation—a living person donating one of their kidneys to a stranger without any benefits or knowing the recipient.

However, current research can only be carried out on a small population that meets the requirements of extreme altruism. Most of the time the research is also via the form of self-report which could lead to self-report biases. Due to the limitations, the current gap between high stakes and normal altruism remains unknown.

=== Characteristics of extreme altruists ===
- Norms

In 1970, Schwartz hypothesised that extreme altruism is positively related to a person's moral norms and is not influenced by the cost associated with the action. This hypothesis was supported in the same study examining bone marrow donors. Schwartz discovered that individuals with strong personal norms and those who attribute more responsibility to themselves are more inclined to participate in bone marrow donation. Similar findings were observed in a 1986 study by Piliavin and Libby focusing on blood donors. These studies suggest that personal norms lead to the activation of moral norms, leading individuals to feel compelled to help others.

- Enhanced Fear Recognition

Abigail Marsh has described psychopaths as the "opposite" group of people to extreme altruists and has conducted studies comparing these two groups of individuals. Utilising techniques such as brain imaging and behavioural experiments, Marsh's team observed that kidney donors tend to have larger amygdala sizes and exhibit better abilities in recognizing fearful expressions compared to psychopathic individuals. Furthermore, an improved ability to recognize fear has been associated with an increase in prosocial behaviours, including greater charity contribution.

- Fast Decisions when Perform Acts of Extreme Altruism

Rand and Epstein explored the behaviours of 51 Carnegie Hero Medal recipients, demonstrating how extreme altruistic behaviours often stem from system I of the Dual Process Theory, which leads to rapid and intuitive behaviours. Additionally, a separate by Carlson et al. indicated that such prosocial behaviours are prevalent in emergencies where immediate actions are required.

This discovery has led to ethical debates, particularly in the context of living organ donation, where laws regarding this issue differ by country. As observed in extreme altruists, these decisions are made intuitively, which may reflect insufficient consideration. Critics are concerned about whether this rapid decision encompasses a thorough cost-benefit analysis and question the appropriateness of exposing donors to such risk.

- Social discounting

Social discounting is the decrease in generosity between a decision maker and a recipient as the social distance between the two increase. One finding suggests how extreme altruists exhibit lower levels of social discounting in their interactions as compared to others. With that meaning extreme altruists place a higher value on the welfare of strangers than a typical person does.

- Low Social-Economic Status

Analysis of 676 Carnegie Hero Award recipients and another study on 243 rescuing acts reveal that a significant proportion of rescuers come from lower socio-economic backgrounds. Johnson attributes the distribution to the high-risk occupations that are more prevalent between lower socioeconomic groups. Another hypothesis proposed by Lyons is that individuals from these groups may perceive they have less to lose when engaging in high-risk extreme altruistic behaviours.

=== Possible explanations ===
Evolutionary theories such as the kin-selection, reciprocity, vested interest and punishment either contradict or do not fully explain the concept of extreme altruism. As a result, considerable research has attempted for a separate explanation for this behaviour.

- Costly Signalling Theory for Extreme Behaviours

Research suggests that males are more likely to engage in heroic and risk-taking behaviours due to a preference among females for such traits. These extreme altruistic behaviours could serve to act as an unconscious "signal" to showcase superior power and ability compared to ordinary individuals. When an extreme altruist survives a high-risk situation, they send an "honest signal" of quality. Three qualities hypothesized to be exhibited by extreme altruists, which could be interpreted as "signals", are: (1) traits that are difficult to fake, (2) a willingness to help, and (3) generous behaviours.

- Empathy-Altruism Hypothesis

The empathy altruism hypothesis appears to align with the concept of extreme altruism without contradiction. The hypothesis was supported with further brain scanning research, which indicates how this group of people demonstrate a higher level of empathy concern. The level of empathy concern then triggers activation in specific brain regions, urging the individual to engage in heroic behaviours.

- Mistakes and Outliers

While most altruistic behaviours offer some form of benefit, extreme altruism may sometimes result from a mistake where the victim does not reciprocate. Considering the impulsive characteristic of extreme altruists, some researchers suggest that these individuals have made a wrong judgement during the cost-benefit analysis. Furthermore, extreme altruism might be a rare variation of altruism where they lie towards to ends of a normal distribution. In the US, the annual prevalence rate per capita is less than 0.00005%, which shows the rarity of such behaviours.

== Digital altruism ==
Digital altruism is the notion that some are willing to freely share information based on the principle of reciprocity and in the belief that in the end, everyone benefits from sharing information via the Internet.

There are three types of digital altruism:

1. "everyday digital altruism", involving expedience, ease, moral engagement, and conformity
2. "creative digital altruism", involving creativity, heightened moral engagement, and cooperation
3. "co-creative digital altruism" involving creativity, moral engagement, and meta cooperative efforts

== See also ==
- Altruria, California – Utopian commune in California
- Bounded rationality – Making of satisfactory, not optimal, decisions
- Charitable organization – Nonprofit organization with charitable purpose
- Consideration – Concept in the common law of contracts
- Egotism – Drive to maintain and enhance favorable views of oneself
- Family economics – Application of economic concepts to the study of the family
- Gene-centered view of evolution – Theory of the "selfish gene"
- Golden Rule – Principle of treating others reciprocally
- Humanity (virtue) – Virtue linked with basic ethics
- Misanthropy – General dislike of humanity
- Mutual aid (organization theory) – Voluntary exchange of resources and services for mutual benefit
- Non nobis solum – Latin for "not for ourselves alone"
- Philanthropy – Private efforts to increase public good
- Prisoner's dilemma – Standard example in game theory
- Prosocial behavior – Intent to benefit others
- Random act of kindness – Unpremeditated act to cheer up another
- Reciprocal altruism – Form of behaviour between organisms
- Social preferences – Human tendency to care about social outcomes
- Social psychology – Study of social effects on people's thoughts, feelings, and behaviors
- Social support – Support systems for individuals
- Solidarity (sociology) – Unity of feeling or action on a common interest
- Spite (game theory)
- Tragedy of the commons – Overuse of a shared resource
