= Sadistic personality disorder =

Former personality disorder involving sadism

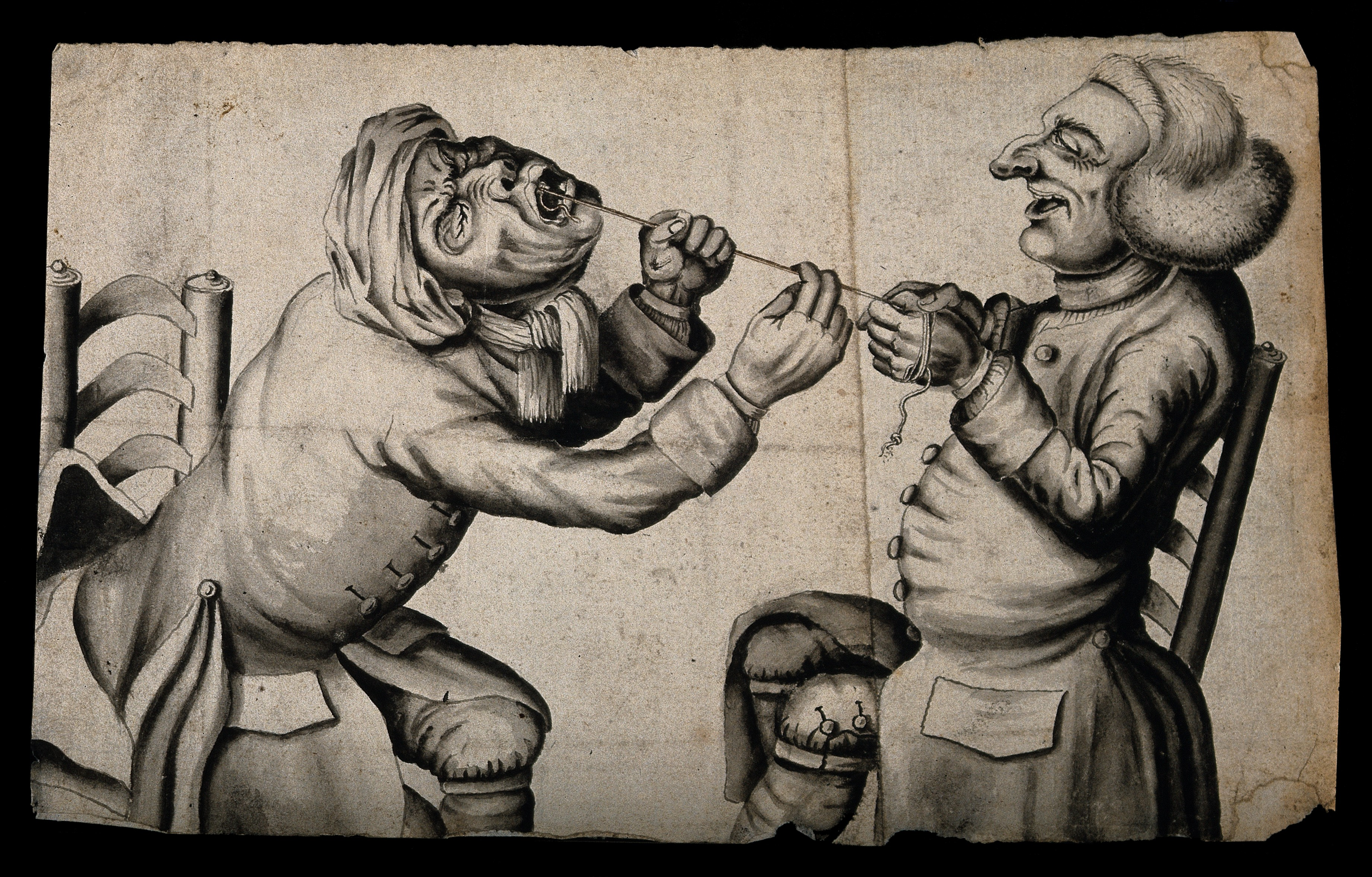
- Illustration showing the pleasure that sadistic people often have from hurting someone
- Specialty: Psychiatry, clinical psychology
- Symptoms: Cruelty, manipulation using fear, preoccupation with violence
- Complications: Substance use disorder, marital, occupational and legal difficulties
- Usual onset: Adolescence
- Causes: Unclear
- Risk factors: Childhood abuse
- Diagnostic method: Based on symptoms
- Differential diagnosis: Antisocial personality disorder and Sexual sadism disorder

Sadistic personality disorder is an obsolete term for a proposed personality disorder defined by a pervasive pattern of sadistic and cruel behavior. People who fitted this diagnosis were thought to have a desire to control others and to have accomplished this through use of physical or emotional violence. The diagnosis proposal appeared in the appendix of the Diagnostic and Statistical Manual of Mental Disorders (DSM-III-R), however it was never put to use in clinical settings and later versions of the DSM (DSM-IV, DSM-IV-TR, and DSM-5) had it removed. Among other reasons, psychiatrists believed it would be used to legally excuse sadistic behavior.

== Comorbidity with other personality disorders ==
Sadistic personality disorder was thought to have been frequently comorbid with other personality disorders, primarily other types of psychopathological disorders. In contrast, sadism has also been found in patients who do not display any or other forms of psychopathic disorders. Conduct disorder in childhood, and alcohol use disorder were thought to have been frequently comorbid with Sadistic personality disorder. Researchers had difficulty distinguishing sadistic personality disorder from the other personality disorders due to high levels of comorbidity, hence another reason why it was eventually removed.

== Diagnostic criteria ==
According to the DSM-III-R, the diagnostic criteria were defined by a pervasive pattern of sadistic and cruel behavior that began in early adulthood. It was defined by four of the following.

- Has used physical cruelty or violence for the purpose of establishing dominance in a relationship (not merely to achieve some noninterpersonal goal, such as striking someone in order to rob him/her).
- Humiliates or demeans people in the presence of others.
- Has treated or disciplined someone under his/her control unusually harshly.
- Is amused by, or takes pleasure in, the psychological or physical suffering of others (including animals).
- Has lied for the purpose of harming or inflicting pain on others (not merely to achieve some other goal).
- Gets other people to do what he/she wants by frightening them (through intimidation or even terror).
- Restricts the autonomy of people with whom he or she has a close relationship, e.g., will not let spouse leave the house unaccompanied or permit teenage daughter to attend social functions.
- Is fascinated by violence, weapons, injury, or torture.

This behavior couldn’t have been better explained by sexual sadism disorder and it had to have been directed towards more than one person.

== Differential diagnosis ==
Diagnosis	Reason
Sexual Sadism Disorder	Sexual sadists will engage in sadistic behavior, however they do so for sexual pleasure, while people with Sadistic personality disorder do so for regular pleasure and to control others.
Antisocial personality disorder	The diagnosis of Antisocial personality disorder requires a history of conduct issues in adolescence and childhood. While the diagnosis of sadistic personality disorder does not.

== Millon's subtypes ==
Theodore Millon claimed there were four subtypes of sadism, which he termed enforcing sadism, explosive sadism, spineless sadism, and tyrannical sadism.

Subtype	Features	Traits
Spineless sadism	Including avoidant features	Insecure, bogus, and cowardly; venomous dominance and cruelty is counterphobic; weakness counteracted by group support; public swaggering; selects powerless scapegoats.
Tyrannical sadism	Including negativistic features	Relishes menacing and brutalizing others, forcing them to cower and submit; verbally cutting and scathing, accusatory and destructive; intentionally surly, abusive, inhumane, unmerciful.
Enforcing sadism	Including compulsive features	Hostility sublimated in the "public interest," cops, "bossy" supervisors, deans, judges; possesses the "right" to be pitiless, merciless, coarse, and barbarous; task is to control and punish, to search out rule breakers.
Explosive sadism	Including borderline features	Unpredictably precipitous outbursts and fury; uncontrollable rage and fearsome attacks; feelings of humiliation are pent-up and discharged; subsequently contrite.

== History ==
Sadistic personality disorder was developed as forensic psychiatrists had noticed many patients with sadistic behavior. It was introduced to the DSM in 1987 and it was placed in the DSM-III-R as a way to facilitate further systematic clinical study and research. It was removed from the DSM for numerous reasons, including the fact it could be used to legally excuse sadistic acts. Sadistic personality disorder also shared a high rate of comorbidity with other disorders, implying that it was not a distinct disorder on its own. Millon writes that "Physically abusive, sadistic personalities are most often male, and it was felt that any such diagnosis might have the paradoxical effect of legally excusing cruel behavior." Researchers were also concerned about the stigmatizing nature of the disorder, and that it put patients at higher risk of abuse from prison guards. Theorists like Theodore Millon wanted to generate further study on SPD, and so proposed it to the DSM-IV Personality Disorder Work Group, who rejected it.

== Sub-clinical sadism in personality psychology ==
There is renewed interest in studying sadism as a personality trait. Sadism joins with subclinical psychopathy, narcissism, and Machiavellianism to form the so-called "dark tetrad" of personality.

== See also ==
- Antisocial personality disorder, a personality disorder characterized by a long term pattern of disregard for, or violation of, the rights of others
- Bullying
- Evil Genes
- Malignant narcissism
- Psychopathy
- Sadism and masochism
- Schadenfreude
- Self-defeating personality disorder (masochistic personality disorder)
- Sexual sadism disorder
- Zoosadism
- Sociopathy
