= Pathological Altruism =

2012 book

- Editor: Barbara A. Oakley, Ariel Knafo, Guruprasad Madhavan, David Sloan Wilson
- Language: English
- Subject: Psychology
- Genre: Non-fiction
- Publisher: Oxford University Press
- Publication date: 5 January 2012
- Publication place: United States
- Pages: 496
- ISBN: 978-0-19-973857-1

Pathological Altruism is a book edited by Barbara Oakley, Ariel Knafo, Guruprasad Madhavan, and David Sloan Wilson. It was published on 5 January 2012 by Oxford University Press, and contains 31 academic papers. Oakley defines pathological altruism as "altruism in which attempts to promote the welfare of others instead result in unanticipated harm".

== Overview ==
The book comprises a collection of essays which discuss negative aspects of altruism and empathy towards others, such as when altruism hurts the altruist, is taken to an unhealthy extreme, or causes more harm than good. Examples given include depression and burnout seen in healthcare professionals, an unhealthy focus on others to the detriment of one's own needs, hoarding of animals, and ineffective philanthropic and social programs that ultimately worsen the situations they are meant to aid. It is considered the first book to explore negative aspects of altruism and empathy.

According to Oakley, anorexia, supporting addictions of other people (codependency), animal hoarding, depression, guilt and self-righteousness can be pathological altruism. Oakley has also stated that suicide bombings and genocides can be caused by pathological altruism, when perpetrators of these acts believe they are behaving altruistically towards those who share their ideology.

Oakley further states that some people are naturally "hypersensitive" or they have an excessive desire to "help" others. According to Oakley, such people are convinced that they are helping others without considering the practical results of their "help".

== Sections ==
1. The psychology of pathological altruism
2. Psychiatric implications of pathological altruism
3. Societal implications of pathological altruism
4. Cultural and evolutionary dimensions of pathological altruism
5. The development and underlying brain processes of pathological altruism
6. Synthesis of views on pathological altruism

== Reviews ==
The book was widely reviewed, including reviews in the New Scientist, and The Independent, and The Los Angeles Review of Books. Nursing Standard said "I recommend this book to health professionals looking for a deeper understanding of altruism and its motivation. The arguments are clear and scholarly, and supported by a wealth of references."

Writing in The New York Times, Natalie Angier called the book a "scholarly yet surprisingly sprightly volume." She wrote,

pathological altruism is not limited to showcase acts of self-sacrifice... The book is the first comprehensive treatment of the idea that when ostensibly generous 'how can I help you?' behavior is taken to extremes, misapplied or stridently rhapsodized, it can become unhelpful, unproductive and even destructive. Selflessness gone awry may play a role in a broad variety of disorders, including anorexia and animal hoarding, women who put up with abusive partners and men who abide alcoholic ones. Because a certain degree of selfless behavior is essential to the smooth performance of any human group, selflessness run amok can crop up in political contexts. It fosters the exhilarating sensation of righteous indignation, the belief in the purity of your team and your cause and the perfidiousness of all competing teams and causes.

== See also ==
- Altruism
- Effective altruism
- Virtue signalling
