= Why Women Don't Code =

2018 essay by Stuart Reges

"Why Women Don't Code" is an essay by University of Washington computer science lecturer Stuart Reges, published in Quillette in June, 2018. The essay, addressing gender disparity in computing, became "one of the most read" items posted in Quillette in 2018 after a link to it was tweeted by Jordan Peterson. (Note: In 2018, it was listed as one of the top ten articles ever carried by Quillette.)

In the article, Reges addresses the question of why much larger numbers of men than women pursue computer science degrees and careers in software engineering. He attributes this disparity to differences in interests between the sexes, rather than to either differences in aptitude or discrimination, whether overt or implicit. He discusses the claim that "the gender gap is mostly the fault of men and the patriarchal organizations they have built to serve their interests" and concludes that it is inconsistent with what he has seen in his experience as a computer science professor. He contends that the field has already "harvested the low-hanging fruit by eliminating overt discrimination and revamping policies and procedures that favored men" and that the percentage of women in technology is unlikely to be raised higher than 20% through further diversity initiatives, while emphasizing that this does not mean that women who choose to enter the field should feel unwelcome.

== Reactions and analysis ==
A response by professor Barbara Oakley was printed in The Wall Street Journal. A response by professor Mark Guzdial was published on the Communications of the ACM blog. A response to the essay written by professor Anna Karlin was posted in Medium and reprinted by the Computing Research Association. The essay was listed by Politico among other "'dangerous' ideas" that made Quillette "the voice of the intellectual dark web".

In 2021, an Associated Students of the University of Washington senator cited the existence of the essay in putting forward a demand that students be able to convene a jury to remove university teaching staff if the jury finds material they publish discriminatory. The senator said Reges violated conduct codes by citing "research on universal sex differences" in the essay, and expressing the conclusion "that systematic oppression is not the cause of the tech field's boy's club mentality".

The essay was assigned reading in a 2023 University of Notre Dame course "Ethical and Professional Issues", and recommended reading for a 2022 UC Davis course "Ethics in an Age of Technology".

== Sources ==
- "Ethical and Professional Issues". official website (Syllabus). University of Notre Dame. Fall 2023.
- "Ethics in an Age of Technology". official website. University of California, Davis. Fall 2022.
- Karlin, Anna R. (c. 2018). "Why Women (and Everyone Else) Should Code". Official website: featured announcements. Computing Research Association. (originally published in Medium Aug 15, 2018)
- Oakley, Barbara (July 13, 2018). "Why Do Women Shun STEM? It's Complicated". The Wall Street Journal (Opinion).
- Goldstein-Street, Jake (January 13, 2020). "Lecturer Stuart Reges claims he's been stripped of computer science teaching duties, admin denies". UW Daily.
- Guzdial, Mark (July 30, 2018). "Moving Computing Education Past Argument from Authority: Stuart Reges and Women Who Code". BLOG@CACM. Communications of the ACM. "Here's something important about Stuart Reges that people outside of CS education might not know: he's a rockstar. He packs the house when he speaks at education conferences. He publishes regularly in the field. He has written a popular book on how to teach Java in introductory computer science (see Building Java Programs). Students love him, and teachers want to be like him. When Stuart Reges speaks, CS educators listen. [but] Stuart Reges is making the argument that we can't have more than 20% women in CS based on his authority. That's an argument that will likely sway a lot of CS educators. We have to raise the standards of our arguments in CS education. We can use research and evidence to do much better than just an argument based on authority."
- Lester, Amelia (November 2018), "The Voice of the 'Intellectual Dark Web'", Politico, "Claire Lehmann's online magazine, Quillette, prides itself on publishing 'dangerous' ideas other outlets won't touch. How far is it willing to go?"
- Hilu, Charles (April 12, 2021). "Student government bill wants students to have power to punish professors found guilty of oppression". The College Fix.
