= Snakes in Suits =

2006 book by Paul Babiak and Robert D. Hare

Snakes In Suits When Psychopaths Go to Work
- Hardcover edition
- Author: Paul Babiak and Robert D. Hare
- Language: English
- Subject: Psychopathy, business
- Publisher: HarperBusiness
- Publication date: May 9, 2006
- Publication place: United States
- Media type: Print
- Pages: 336
- ISBN: 978-0-06-083772-3

Snakes in Suits: When Psychopaths Go to Work is a 2006 non-fiction book by industrial psychologist Paul Babiak and Robert D. Hare, a criminal psychologist known for the Hare Psychopathy Checklist. The book describes how a workplace psychopath can take power in a business using manipulation.

== Contents ==
The text covers the nature of psychopaths in the context of employment and purports to explain how psychopaths manipulate their way into work and get promoted, the effects of their presence on colleagues and corporations, and the superficial similarities (and fundamental differences) between leadership skills and psychopathic traits. The work is interlaced with fictional narratives illustrating how the factual content applies to real-life situations. Characteristics of manipulators are described as shifting to meet stereotypical gender expectations: a female psychopath might make full use of the passive, warm, nurturing, and dependent gender role stereotype in order to get what she wants out of others and a male psychopath might use a macho image, intimidation, and aggression to achieve satisfaction of his desires. The authors posit that around 1% of senior positions in business are occupied by psychopaths.

The authors describe a "five phase model" of how a typical workplace psychopath climbs to and maintains power: entry, assessment, manipulation, confrontation, and ascension.

1. In the entry stage, the psychopath uses highly developed social skills and charm to obtain employment in an organization. At this stage it is difficult to spot anything which is indicative of psychopathic behavior, and new employees might perceive the psychopath to be helpful and even benevolent.
2. Once on to the assessment stage, the psychopath considers an employee's usefulness and could recognize them either as a pawn (who has some informal influence and can be easily manipulated) or a patron (who has formal power and can be used by the psychopath to protect against attacks).
3. Manipulation involves the psychopath creating a scenario of "psychopathic fiction" where positive information about themselves and negative disinformation about others is created, where the role of others as a part of a network of pawns or patrons are used and groomed into accepting the psychopath's agenda.
4. In the confrontation stage, the psychopath uses techniques of character assassination to maintain their agenda, and others are either discarded as a pawn or used as a patron.
5. Finally, in the ascension stage, the psychopath takes for themselves a position of power and prestige from anyone who once supported them and discards the pawn or patron if they are no longer useful.

The book also contains a statement from Hare addressing his role in the 2003 documentary film The Corporation, in which he is interviewed on the topic of corporations being considered psychopaths. Hare states that despite the filmmakers telling him they were using psychopathy metaphorically to describe "the most egregious" corporate misbehavior, the finished documentary uses his statements to suggest that corporations are psychopathic in general or by definition. Hare disagrees, deeming it an inaccurate generalization and arguing that if common diagnostic criteria were applied to random corporations, "some might apply for the diagnosis of psychopathy, but most would not."

== Reception ==
A review of Snakes in Suits by The Australian called it "a lay guide to corporate psychopaths" and concluded that "However wooden in parts, Snakes in Suits is a valuable addition to any business library."

Snakes in Suits has also been reviewed by Publishers Weekly, Booklist, Psychology Today, California Bookwatch, Security Management, Canadian Business, and Finweek.

== See also ==
- The Mask of Sanity – by Hervey M. Cleckley, first published in 1941
- Without Conscience: The Disturbing World of the Psychopaths Among Us – by Robert D. Hare, first published in 1993
- Evil Genes – by Barbara Oakley, published in 2007
- The Psychopath Test – by Jon Ronson, published in 2011
