= Glenn Walters =

Glenn Walters may refer to:

- Glenn D. Walters, American forensic psychologist
- Glenn M. Walters (born 1957), United States Marine Corps general
