= Andreas Meyer-Lindenberg =

German psychiatrist

- Born: 31 October 1965 (age 60); Bonn, West Germany
- Education: Rheinische Friedrich-Wilhelms-Universität; Justus-Liebig University; University of Hagen
- Spouse: Bettina Burghardt
- Children: 2
- Scientific career
- Fields: Psychiatric genetics
- Institutions: Heidelberg University

Andreas Meyer-Lindenberg (born 31 October 1965) is a German psychiatrist and professor in the Medical Faculty Mannheim at Heidelberg University. He is also the director and CEO of the Central Institute of Mental Health in Mannheim, as well as medical director of their Department of Psychiatry and Psychotherapy. His research includes work on the genetics of complex psychiatric disorders. He has also used neuroimaging to study the neurobiological basis of mental disorders such as Williams Syndrome, and the effects of living in urban areas on mental health and the human brain.

== Life and career ==
Meyer-Lindenberg was born in Bonn. He studied medicine in Bonn and at Cornell University in New York, and mathematics at the Fernuniversität Hagen. He has been a member of the Corps Palatia Bonn since 1984. He is the grandson of the diplomat Hermann Meyer-Lindenberg and the great-grandson of the left-liberal politician Oscar Meyer and the philatelist Carl Lindenberg.

His medical and scientific work took him via Bonn and Giessen, where he was trained as a neurologist, psychiatrist and psychotherapist, to the National Institute of Mental Health in Bethesda (Maryland). In 2007, he succeeded Fritz Henn as director of the Central Institute of Mental Health, medical director of the clinic for psychiatry and psychotherapy there and full professor for psychiatry and psychotherapy at the Mannheim Medical Faculty of the University of Heidelberg. The scientific focus of Andreas Meyer-Lindenberg's work is on researching risk and protective mechanisms in serious mental illnesses such as schizophrenia and depression using imaging, genetic and environmental methods.

As a "highly cited researcher" he has been regularly identified as one of the most cited scientists in his field. In 2009 he was elected a member of the German Academy of Sciences Leopoldina, in 2011 a full member of the Heidelberg Academy of Sciences and in 2022 a member of the Academia Europaea. Meyer-Lindenberg is a member of several Scientific Advisory Boards, including Brain Mind Institute – Swiss Federal Institutes of Technology Lausanne, Robert-Sommer Award for Schizophrenia Research, Research Priority Program on "Foundation of Human Social Behavior" – University of Zurich, The Loop Zurich – Medical Research Center, Endosane Pharmaceuticals, Neurotorium and The Brain Prize and a member of the board of several professional societies such as the German Society for Psychiatry and Psychotherapy, Psychosomatics and Neurology (DGPPN).

Andreas Meyer-Lindenberg is site spokesperson at the German Center for Mental Health and serves as Editor-in-Chief of Neuroscience Applied as part of the European College of Neuropsychopharmacology (ECNP) Executive Committee (2022–2025).

== Honors and awards ==
- Member of the Academia Europaea (2022)
- Roger de Spoelberch Prize (2013)
- ECNP Neuropsychopharmacology Award (2012)
- Member of the Heidelberg Academy of Sciences (2011)
- Kurt Schneider Science Prize (2010)
- Member of the German Academy of Natural Scientists Leopoldina (2009)
- AE Bennett Research Award, Society of Biological Psychiatry (2007)
- Joel Elkes International Award for Clinical Research, American College of Neuropsychopharmacology (2006)
- Roche/Nature Medicine Award for Translational Neuroscience (2006)
- Bench-to-Bedside award, NIMH/ORD/NIAAA (2004–2006)
- National Institutes of Health Fellows Award for Excellence in Biomedical Research (1999–2001)
- International Congress for Schizophrenia Research Award (2001)
- NARSAD Young Investigator Award (2000)
- Bristol-Myer-Squibb Young Investigator Award (1998)
