= Frank Krueger =

Neuroscientist and psychologist

Frank Krueger is a neuroscientist and psychologist. He is professor of systems social neuroscience in the School of Systems Biology at George Mason University, where he heads the Social Cognition, Interaction, and Future Intelligence (SCI:FI) laboratory. His research concerns the neural basis of interpersonal trust and social decision-making.

== Education ==
Krueger received a master's degree in physics from the Free University of Berlin, and a master's degree in psychology from Humboldt University of Berlin. He went on to a doctorate in cognitive psychology from Humboldt University in 2001, and also completed his habilitation there.

== Research ==
Krueger applies functional neuroimaging and lesion mapping to social cognition. He was the first author of a 2007 study in the Proceedings of the National Academy of Sciences that used simultaneous functional magnetic resonance imaging of two interacting people during a repeated reciprocal trust game, and distinguished the brain systems involved in conditional trust, associated with the ventral tegmental area, from those involved in unconditional trust, associated with the septal area, and a co-author of earlier work on the neural basis of moral cognition and of charitable donation. With Andreas Meyer-Lindenberg he proposed a model of interpersonal trust drawing on neuroscience, psychology and economics in a 2019 review in Trends in Neurosciences. He edited The Neurobiology of Trust (Cambridge University Press, 2021), a multidisciplinary volume on the subject.

== Selected publications ==
- Moll, Jorge; Zahn, Roland; de Oliveira-Souza, Ricardo; Krueger, Frank; Grafman, Jordan (2005). "The neural basis of human moral cognition". Nature Reviews Neuroscience. 6 (10): 799–809. doi:10.1038/nrn1768. PMID 16276356.
- Moll, Jorge; Krueger, Frank; et al. (2006). "Human fronto–mesolimbic networks guide decisions about charitable donation". Proceedings of the National Academy of Sciences. 103 (42): 15623–15628. doi:10.1073/pnas.0604475103. PMC 1622872.
- Krueger, Frank; et al. (2007). "Neural correlates of trust". Proceedings of the National Academy of Sciences. 104 (50): 20084–20089. doi:10.1073/pnas.0710103104. PMC 2148426.
- Krueger, Frank; Barbey, Aron K.; Grafman, Jordan (2009). "The medial prefrontal cortex mediates social event knowledge". Trends in Cognitive Sciences. 13 (3): 103–109. doi:10.1016/j.tics.2008.12.005. PMID 19223228.
- Krueger, Frank; Meyer-Lindenberg, Andreas (2019). "Toward a model of interpersonal trust drawn from neuroscience, psychology, and economics". Trends in Neurosciences. 42 (2): 92–101. doi:10.1016/j.tins.2018.10.004. PMID 30482606.
- Krueger, Frank, ed. (2021). The Neurobiology of Trust. Cambridge University Press. ISBN 978-1-108-48856-3.
