= Abigail Marsh =

American psychologist and researcher (born 1976)

Marsh in 2012

Abigail Marsh (born 1976) is an American psychologist and neuroscientist who works as a professor at Georgetown University's Department of Psychology and the Interdisciplinary Neuroscience Program, where she is the director of the Laboratory on Social and Affective Neuroscience. Much of Marsh's work pertains to the study of altruism and why people may help others at their own cost.

== Early life and education ==
Marsh was born in 1976 and is from Tacoma, Washington.

She graduated from Dartmouth College in 1999 with a bachelor of arts in psychology. She received her PhD in social psychology from Harvard University in 2004, where she previously earned an MA in the same discipline in 2001.

== Career ==
After graduating from Harvard, Marsh worked as a postdoctoral researcher at the National Institute of Mental Health until 2008. She then began to work at Georgetown University, and in October 2013, she became tenured.

Marsh is the director of the Laboratory on Social and Affective Neuroscience at Georgetown, which conducts research on empathy, altruism, and other related topics through various methods, such as brain imaging and pharmacology. Her research has been funded by the National Institutes of Health, the National Science Foundation, and the John Templeton Foundation. She is on the advisory board of Donor to Donor, an organization that promotes living kidney donation.

Marsh has written articles for Slate, Psychology Today, Business Insider, The Guardian, NPR, The Wall Street Journal, The Chronicle of Higher Education, and other publications. In September 2016, she presented her story and work in a TED talk in Banff, Canada.

=== Research ===
Much of Marsh's work pertains to the study of altruism and why people may help others at their own cost. More generally, she researches in the field of social and affective neuroscience and psychology. On the topic of altruism, Marsh's research has yielded more information about the amygdala, showing that in altruists, the amygdalae tend to be larger, and in psychopaths it tends to be smaller. The amygdala is the part of the brain responsible for processing emotions and fear. In 2014, Marsh published a paper in the Proceedings of the National Academy of Sciences that concluded a spectrum existed with extreme altruists on one end and psychopaths at the other. She has also published multiple studies that show that, when altruists watch someone else feel pain, they have levels of activity in similar regions of their brain as when they feel pain themselves, concluding that altruists are better at recognizing the fear of others. Marsh leads work at Georgetown with altruistic donors, particularly those who have donated kidneys to strangers.

Her work with children and adolescents has been used to show how different neural workings can lead to behavioral problems.

In 2019, Marsh conducted research on altruism in kidney donors and stem cell donors using behavioral investigations and brain imaging, as well as using those methods to study the causes of conduct problems in children and adolescents. In the same year, she led a study that found, among other conclusions, that Americans are surprisingly successful at distinguishing other Americans from Australians by visual cues, like walking, waving one's hand, or smiling.

== The Fear Factor ==
In 2017, Marsh published a book on the topic of altruists and psychopaths. Originally titled Good for Nothing in the UK, the book is entitled The Fear Factor: How One Emotion Connects Altruists, Psychopaths, and Everyone In-Between in the US (and in later UK editions). It covers her research on aggression, altruism, and empathy in the context of neuroscience.

== Awards and recognition ==
Marsh is a recipient of the National Institute of Mental Health's 2007 Richard J Wyatt Memorial Award for translational research. In 2014, she received the Cozzarelli Prize for work on altruism she had published in the Proceedings of the National Academy of Sciences of the United States of America|Proceedings of the National Academy of Sciences. The research she coauthored studied "extraordinary altruists", focusing on people who donated kidneys to strangers. In 2016, Marsh was named a fellow in the Society for Personality and Social Psychology. In 2017, the S&R Foundation awarded her their Kuno Award for Applied Science for the Social Good. In 2018, Marsh was awarded the Book Prize for the Promotion of Social and Personality Science by the Society for Personality and Social Psychology for her 2017 book The Fear Factor.
