= Caregiver stress =

Non-clinical mental health condition

Caregiver syndrome or caregiver stress is a condition that manifests exhaustion, anger, rage, or guilt resulting from unrelieved caring for a chronically ill person. This condition is not listed in the United States' Diagnostic and Statistical Manual of Mental Disorders, although healthcare professionals use the term in that country. The equivalent in many other countries, the ICD-11, does list caregiver stress.

Over 1 in 5 Americans care for the ill, aged, or disabled. Over 13 million caregivers care for their own children as well. Caregiver syndrome is acute when caring for someone with behaviors such as fecal incontinence, memory issues, sleep problems, wandering, impulse control problems, executive dysfunction, and/or aggression. Typical symptoms of caregiver stress include fatigue, insomnia and stomach complaints. The most common symptom is depression.

== Signs and symptoms ==
Those who care for a person with a long-term illness often experience chronic stress. Caregiving can affect the immune system. Caregivers to people with dementia, particularly frontal temporal patients, were more depressed, and showed lower life satisfaction than comparator samples. The caregivers also had higher EBV antibody titres and lower percentages of T cells and T_{H} cells. Caregiving has adverse effects on wound repair.

These biological vulnerabilities are also seen in younger caregivers, implying that it is not an age and caregiver stress interaction. For example, caregivers of children with developmental disabilities have lower antibody responses to vaccination compared to age and gender matched non-caregiver controls. Higher blood pressure has also been observed in younger caregivers compared to a control group of parents. This is particularly strong for those without social support.

Symptoms include depression, anxiety, and anger. Chronic stress can create medical problems including high blood pressure, diabetes, and a compromised immune system. The impact may reduce the caregiver's life expectancy.

Almost two out of three carers of people with dementia feel lonely. Most carers in the study were family members or friends.

Elderly caregivers are at a 63 percent higher risk of mortality than non-caregivers in the same age group. This trend may be due to raised levels of stress hormones. These levels are similar to someone with PTSD. Because caregivers have to be so immersed in their roles, with day/night hours, they often neglect their own health. They experience high stress along with grief while their loved one's health declines. Since their roles are changing from a partnership or parent/child, etc. relationship to caregiver and patient, caregivers turn to online forums such as the Alzheimer's Association for support. This role change is difficult for many, causing them to feel anger, resentment, and guilt. It is difficult to provide quality care in this state of stress.

The health of caregivers should be monitored in various ways. There are tests for measuring the amount of stress on a caregiver.

Caregivers are at risk of adverse health effects due to emotional distress. Even after caregiving has ended, these stressors can have long-lasting effects on the caregiver's body due to these immune alterations.

Since caregiving can further erode the caregiver's own health, studies are being done to assess the risks that a caregiver takes on when they assume this job and its effects on their immune function, endocrine functioning, risk for depression, poor quality of sleep, long-term changes in stress responses, Cardiovascular diseases, an increased risk of infectious disease, and even death. Resentment from the patient is what may lead to the depression and distress typically seen in caregivers. This anxiety and depression can then lead back into the health of the caregiver. Generally, research suggests that this role can result in an overall decrease in the quality of life for individuals whom take it on.

The World Health Organization's categorisation of health conditions, the ICD-11, has a category of "QF27 Difficulty or need for assistance at home and no other household member able to render care". Its browser and coding tool also associate this condition with the term "caregiver burnout", connecting it to occupational burnout.

=== Caregiver burnout ===
Bodies such as the U.S. government's Centers for Disease Control and Prevention, the American Diabetes Association, and Diabetes Singapore identify and promote the phenomenon of "diabetes burnout". This relates to the self-care of people with diabetes, particularly those with type-2 diabetes. "Diabetes burnout speaks to the physical and emotional exhaustion that people with diabetes experience when they have to deal with caring for themselves on a day-to-day basis. When you have to do so many things to stay in control then it does take a toll on your emotions... Once they get frustrated, some of them give up and stop (maintaining) a healthy diet, taking their medications regularly, going for exercises and this will result in poor diabetes control."

== Causes ==
Caregiver syndrome is caused by the overwhelming duty of caring for a disabled or chronically ill person leading to increased stress hormone levels for an extended period. Caregivers also suffer the grief of a declining loved one, as causing a depressive exhaustive state, deteriorating emotional and mental health. "Double-duty caregivers" are those already working in the healthcare field who feel obligated to also care for their loved ones at home. This over-exhaustion and constant caregiving role can cause an increase in physical and mental health deterioration. It is actually being thought that a part of the stress of being a caregiver is from how they feel about the job. In other words, if a caregiver does not like or want to be a caregiver, they will inflict more stress on themselves by accepting the role. Support from the religious community is directly and negatively associated with anger.

=== Risks ===
The American Academy of Geriatric Psychiatrists reports one out of four American families care for a family member over the age of 50. By 2030, the U.S. Census Bureau estimates a population of 71 million Americans over 65. In the U.K., over 450,000 dementia patients are cared for at home. Nevertheless, over half of the caregivers (52.6%) indicated that they had some desire to institutionalize their relatives with dementia.

The American Academy of Family Physicians and the National Center on Caregiving both believe all caregivers should be screened for stress and depression and recommend providing caregivers with their own resources to help them cope.

Since family (and more often one member) most often assumes the primary caregiver role, these strains fall upon them. Care for the chronically ill is irregular, so there are not many facilities that can provide adequate care. This caregiving role is more commonly assumed by women than men. Since some illnesses create a more intense need for caregiving, the caregiver is responsible for almost every aspect in the patient's life. One of the positive aspects of caregiving for a loved one is that it can improve their quality of life, but when the caregiver is depleted of confidence, the recovery may be hindered.

Parents of children with CHD experience psychological distress such as high levels of caregiver stress, anxiety and depression compared to parents of children without complex needs.

Caregiving for veterans with a traumatic brain injury or PTSD can be very challenging as well. On April 21, 2010, the U.S. Congress passed what is known as the "Caregivers and Veterans Omnibus Health Services Act of 2010". This act recognizes the importance of caregivers who are caring for Veterans, and establishes a program of assistance for them with benefits including covering counseling and mental health services under the benefits of Department of Veterans Affairs.

== Issues in health care ==
Since this term, "Caregiver syndrome" is widely used among physicians, but it is not mentioned in the Diagnostic and Statistical Manual of Mental Disorders (DSM) or in medical literature, physicians are not always sure how to approach the issues that arise with this syndrome. Therefore, this is not addressed frequently. In a survey given by the American Academy of Family Physicians, they found that fewer than 50 percent of caregivers were asked by their doctors whether or not they were experiencing caregiver stress. If this were listed in the DSM with an official diagnosis, it could possibly stigmatize those who have it. Many believe it would be beneficial for this to receive a clinical name, though, so caregivers would be able to receive the appropriate resources they need. This would encourage health care professionals to develop better strategies for treatment of Caregiver Syndrome, as well as requiring health insurance agencies to pay for appropriate treatment.

Although previous studies indicate a negative association between caregivers' anger and health, the potential mechanisms linking this relationship are not yet fully understood.

== Prevention ==
Effective coping strategies such as sleep, exercise and relaxation can help prevent stress. Caregivers fare better when they have active coping skills, such as these coping interventions: mindfulness-based stress reduction, writing therapy, coping effectiveness training, stress management, relaxation training, and Assistive Technology. For example, a 2025 study found that informal caregivers who engaged in repeated self-disclosure to a social robot experienced reduced stress and loneliness, improved mood, and greater acceptance of their caregiving roles, suggesting potential benefits of social robots as emotional support tools for caregivers.

Nearly 15 million Americans provide care that is unpaid to a person living with Dementia. Alzheimer's disease is the most commonly diagnosed type but research says that caring for a person with Frontotemporal Dementia is more burdensome on carers. Early onset Dementia has even greater difficulties for carers. In many cases carers are overburdened and not supported and their health suffers. In order to maintain their own well-being, caregivers need to focus on their own needs. They need to take time for their own health, and get the appropriate support that they need such as respite from their care-giving duties. Through training, caregivers can learn how to handle the behaviors that are challenging them, and improve their own communication skills. The most important thing the caregiver can do is keep the person with Alzheimer's safe. Research has shown that caregivers experience lower stress and better health when they learn skills through this caregiving training and participate in support groups. Participating in these groups allows caregivers to care for their family members longer in their homes.

A 2014 Cochrane review found that telephone counseling can reduce symptoms of depression for caregivers and address other important caregiver needs.

=== Remotely delivered information for caregivers ===
A 2021 Cochrane review found that remotely delivered interventions including support, training and information may reduce the burden for the informal caregiver and improve their depressive symptoms. However, there is no certain evidence that they improve health-related quality of life. The findings are based on moderate certainty evidence from 26 studies.

=== REACH Program ===
The Resources for Enhancing Alzheimer's Caregiver Health (REACH) Project was created in 1995. This project was designed to enhance family caregiving for those who were taking care of relatives that have Alzheimer's disease and other related dementia (ADRD). This program includes: support groups, behavioral skills training programs, and family-based systems interventions.

This program was designed specifically for people who are caring for a loved one with Alzheimer's Disease or Dementia at home, and makes it possible for those with dementia to live in the own homes longer by addressing these problems of caregiver health that force the caregiver to move their loved ones to assisted-living facilities. If they can manage the challenges that come along with caregiving better, both will benefit from this. Special one-on-one training is provided for the caregiver, as well as counseling. This allows them to be more effective in their caregiving roles. They receive help directly from dementia care specialists who work with the client on an individual basis to find solutions to problems such as: caregiver stress, challenging behaviors, home safety, depression, self care, and social support.

== Benefits of caregiving ==
Caregiving can actually provide a health advantage as well for some caregivers. Caregivers maintained higher physical performance when compared to non-caregivers. They declined less in tasks than the low-intensity caregivers and non-caregivers such as: walking pace, grip strength, and the speed with which they could rise from a chair. Caregivers also did significantly better on memory tasks than did non-caregivers over a 2-year time frame. Caregivers scored at the level of someone 10 years younger than them, although both groups (caregivers vs. non-caregivers) were both in their eighties.

While this role brings with it high costs, high rewards are also there too. This is known as "Caregiver gain". These rewards are emotional, psychological, and spiritual such as: growing confidence in one's ability, feelings of personal satisfaction and increased family closeness.

Women who become caregivers are healthy enough to take on the task, therefore it makes sense that they would be stronger than their non-caregiver counterparts, and remain stronger than them. The demands of caregiving cause caregivers to move around a lot, and stay on their feet. Therefore, exercise can improve both physical health and cognition. The complex thought as required by caregiving can ward off cognitive decline. This includes activities such as: monitoring medications, scheduling, and financial responsibilities.

Other benefits mentioned by caregivers are that it gives their life meaning, and produces pride in their success as a caregiver. They are also able to give back to someone else. It has also been noted that psychological benefit finding can be an important way of dealing with stress. The Perceived Benefits of Caregiving scale includes 11 items with questions such as, "Has caregiving given more meaning to your life?" and "Has caregiving made you feel important?" There was an alpha coefficient of 0.7 for this scale. These benefits of caregiving have been found to be associated with improved caregiver adaptation to those who are caring for someone with dementia, end of life caregiving, and bereavement. A study done with dementia caregivers showed that finding the benefits in caregiving predicted a better response to a caregiver intervention over a time period of 12 months.

== See also ==
- Care work
- Compassion fatigue
- Occupational burnout
- Pathological Altruism
