= GABRB2 =

Protein-coding gene in the species Homo sapiens

Identifiers
- Aliases: GABRB2, gamma-aminobutyric acid type A receptor beta2 subunit, ICEE2, gamma-aminobutyric acid type A receptor subunit beta2, DEE92
- External IDs: OMIM: 600232; MGI: 95620; GeneCards: GABRB2

Gene location (Human)
Chr.	Chromosome 5 (human)
Band	5q34	Start	161,288,429 bp
Band	5q34	End	161,549,044 bp

Gene location (Mouse)
Chr.	Chromosome 11 (mouse)
Band	11 A5|11 25.08 cM	Start	42,310,584 bp
Band	11 A5|11 25.08 cM	End	42,519,855 bp
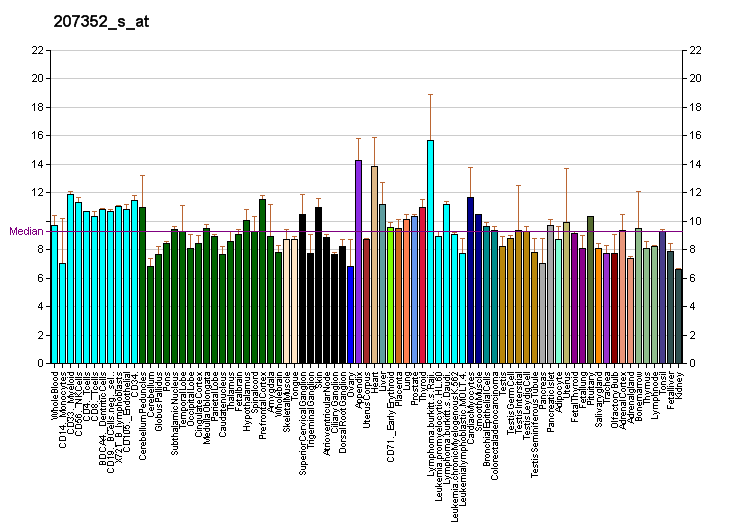
RNA expression pattern
Bgee	Human / Mouse (ortholog); Top expressed in: Brodmann area 23; endothelial cell; lateral nuclear group of thalamus; postcentral gyrus; middle temporal gyrus; entorhinal cortex; buccal mucosa cell; external globus pallidus; superior frontal gyrus; primary visual cortex / Top expressed in: lateral geniculate nucleus; medial geniculate nucleus; medial dorsal nucleus; globus pallidus; cerebellar vermis; lateral septal nucleus; lobe of cerebellum; lateral hypothalamus; anterior amygdaloid area; ventromedial nucleus; More reference expression data
BioGPS	More reference expression data
Gene ontology
Molecular function	inhibitory extracellular ligand-gated ion channel activity; ion channel activity; GABA receptor activity; chloride channel activity; extracellular ligand-gated ion channel activity; GABA-A receptor activity; transmembrane signaling receptor activity; transmitter-gated ion channel activity involved in regulation of postsynaptic membrane potential; GABA-gated chloride ion channel activity
Cellular component	integral component of membrane; cytosol; GABA-A receptor complex; postsynaptic membrane; membrane; plasma membrane; integral component of plasma membrane; synapse; chloride channel complex; cell junction; GABA receptor complex; extracellular exosome; cytoplasmic vesicle membrane; cytoplasmic vesicle; neuron projection; GABA-ergic synapse; integral component of postsynaptic specialization membrane
Biological process	gamma-aminobutyric acid signaling pathway; negative regulation of neuron apoptotic process; chemical synaptic transmission; cochlea development; regulation of neuron apoptotic process; neuron development; chloride transmembrane transport; synaptic transmission, GABAergic; hearing; ion transport; inner ear receptor cell development; chloride transport; innervation; negative regulation of neuron death; cellular response to histamine; transport; signal transduction; ion transmembrane transport; regulation of membrane potential; nervous system process; regulation of postsynaptic membrane potential; inhibitory synapse assembly
Sources:Amigo / QuickGO
Orthologs
Databases	NCBI: entry; OMA: entry
Species	Human	Mouse
Entrez	2561	14401
Ensembl	ENSG00000145864	ENSMUSG00000007653
UniProt	P47870	P63137
RefSeq (mRNA)	NM_000813; NM_021911; NM_001371727	NM_008070; NM_001347314; NM_001362646; NM_001362647; NM_001362649
RefSeq (protein)	NP_000804; NP_068711; NP_001358656	NP_001334243; NP_032096; NP_001349575; NP_001349576; NP_001349578
Location (UCSC)	Chr 5: 161.29 – 161.55 Mb	Chr 11: 42.31 – 42.52 Mb
PubMed search
- Wikidata
View/Edit Human	View/Edit Mouse

The GABAA beta-2 subunit is a protein that in humans is encoded by the GABRB2 gene. It combines with other subunits to form the ionotropic GABAA receptors. GABA (γ-aminobutyric acid) system is the major inhibitory system in the brain, and its dominant GABAA receptor subtype is composed of α1, β2, and γ2 subunits with the stoichiometry of 2:2:1, which accounts for 43% of all GABAA receptors. Alternative splicing of the GABRB2 gene leads at least to four isoforms, viz. β2-long (β2L) and β2-short (β2S, β2S1, and β2S2). Alternatively spliced variants displayed similar but non-identical electrophysiological properties. GABRB2 is subjected to positive selection and known to be both an alternative splicing and a recombination hotspot; it is regulated via epigenetic regulation including imprinting and gene and promoter methylation GABRB2 has been associated with a number of neuropsychiatric disorders, and found to display altered expression in cancer.

== Structure ==
GABRB2 encodes the GABAA receptor beta-2 subunit. It is highly expressed in the brain with dominance in the gray matter. In humans, it is located on chromosome 5q34, with 11 exons and 10 introns spanning more than 260 kb, and a promoter region ranging from 1000 bp upstream to 689 bp downstream of exon 1. Alternative splicing of the gene product yields at least four isoforms, viz. β2-long (β2L), β2-short (β2S) and two additional short isoforms β2S1 and β2S2. These isoforms, composed of 512, 474, 313, and 372 amino acids respectively, display dissimilar electrophysiological properties. In mice, the corresponding Gabrb2 gene on chromosome 11A5 comprises 12 exons and 11 introns, and the two isoforms β2L and β2S from alternative splicing consisted of 512 and 474 amino acids respectively. The β-2 subunit is a component of the ligand-gated chloride GABAA receptors which belongs to the Cys-loop superfamily. Like all subunits of this family, it consists of an extracellular N-terminal domain containing a Cys-loop of 13 amino acids, four membrane-spanning domains (TM1-4) with a large intracellular loop between TM3 and TM4, and an extracellular C-terminal domain. Five subunits from varied families (α1-6, β1-3, γ1-3, δ, ε, π, θ, ρ1-3) combine to form the heteropentameric GABAA receptor. TM2 from each subunit participates in the formation of the ion pore of the receptor, and α2β2γ2 is the major subtype in the brain that accounts for 43% of all GABAA receptors.

== Regulation ==
Phosphorylation is an important mechanism for the modulation of GABAA receptor function. GABRB2 includes a consensus sequence for a calmodulin-dependent protein kinase II within exon 10 which is only expressed by β2L. As a result, upon repetitive stimulation, the β2L isoform-containing GABAA receptors are more vulnerable to run-down than those containing the short isoforms. Accordingly, ATP depletion reduces the inhibitory transmission of the GABAergic system due to GABAA receptors rundown through β2. Since this rundown occasioned by the presence of β2L would lead to improved maintenance of survival-favoring activities such as hunting and food gathering in the face of energy deprivation, it could be selected as an evolutionary advantage over the shorter isoforms. Multiple lines of evidence confirmed the epigenetic regulation of GABRB2 gene expression via methylation and imprinting. GABRB2 mRNA expression level varied with germline genotypes, and with the gender of the parent in accord with the process of imprinting.

== Function ==
GABRB2 is highly expressed in the brain where it plays its major role. In the immature brain, GABAA receptors participate in excitatory transmission, which is important to synaptogenesis, neurogenesis, and the formation of the glutamatergic system. In the mature brain, GABAA receptors fulfill their conventional inhibitory role, with the β2 subunits participating in some of the fastest inhibitory transmissions that prevent hyperexcitability, regulate the stress response of the hypothalamic-pituitary-adrenal axis, as well as pain signals mediated by the thalamus. Moreover, GABRB2 is associated with cognitive function, energy regulation, time perception, and the maintenance of efferent synaptic terminals in the mature ear.

== Clinical significance ==
GABRB2 is associated with a spectrum of neuropsychiatric disorders, and displays of differential gene expression between tumor and non tumor tissues.

=== Psychiatric disorders ===
==== Schizophrenia ====
Single nucleotide polymorphisms (SNPs) in GABRB2 were first associated with schizophrenia (SCZ) in Han Chinese, and confirmed subsequently for German, Portuguese, and Japanese SCZ patients. Furthermore, their significant associations have been extended to cognitive function, psychosis, and neuroleptic-induced tardive dyskinesia in schizophrenics. Recurrent copy number variations (CNVs) in GABRB2 were likewise associated with schizophrenia. GABRB2 expression was decreased in genotype and age-dependent manners, with reduced β2L/β2S ratios in schizophrenics serving as a key determinant of the response of receptor function to the energy status. The regulation of its expression by methylation and imprinting, as well as its N-glycosylation of the β2-subunit, were altered in SCZ. That GABRB2 is both a recombination hotspot and subject to positive selection could be an important factor in the widespread occurrence of SCZ. Gabrb2-knockout mice displayed schizophrenia-like behavior including prepulse inhibition deficit and antisocial behavior that were ameliorated by the antipsychotic risperidone, strongly supporting the proposal based on postmortem SCZ brains that GABRB2 represents the key genetic factor in SCZ etiology.

==== Other psychiatric disorders ====
GABRB2 was significantly associated with bipolar disorder, with a genotype-dependent decrease in GABRB2 mRNA levels weaker than that observed in SCZ. In major depressive disorder, the expressions of GABAA subunit genes were altered, and the expression of GABRB2 was significantly decreased in the anterior cingulate cortex, in the postmortem brains of patients. The expression of GABRB2 was significantly increased in the internet gaming disorder group, and GABRB2 was the downstream target for two circulating microRNA, viz. hsa-miR-26b-5p and hsa-miR-652-3p, which were significantly downregulated in these subjects. The GABAergic system was suggested to be a factor in the physiopathology of premenstrual dysphoric disorder (PMDD). GABA levels were altered in the brain of PMDD patients. Two highly recurrent copy number variations in GABRB2 were associated with PMDD in Chinese and German patients, providing thereby a possible explanation of part of the complex psychological symptoms of PMDD.

=== Drug dependence ===
SNPs in GABRB2 were significantly associated with alcohol dependence and consumption in Southwestern Native Americans, Finnish, Scottish, and Sidney populations. Chronic alcohol administration induced an increase in the expression of Gabrb2 in a rat model. and sleep time was decreased in Gabrb2 knockout mice. SNPs in GABRB2 were significantly associated with heroin addiction in African American subjects. Haplotypes in GABRB2 yielded a significant association with heroin dependence in the Chinese population.

=== Neurological disorders ===
==== Epilepsy ====
Numerous de novo mutations in GABRB2 were associated with infantile and early childhood epileptic encephalopathy (IECEE). As well, SNPs in GABRB2 were significantly associated with epilepsy in the North Indian population. Moreover, Gabrb2 knockout mice displayed audiogenic epilepsy, which further confirmed the contribution of GABRB2 to the etiology of epilepsy.

==== Autism spectrum disorder ====
The density of GABAA receptors showed a significant reduction in autistic brains. and SNPs in GABRB2 were significantly associated with autism. De novo pathogenic mutations in the GABRB2 gene contribute to the physiopathology of Rett syndrome. β2 subunit mRNA expression level was subjected to significant upregulation in a mouse model of Rett syndrome

=== Neurodegenerative disorders ===
Deficits in the GABergic system and decreased levels of GABA were reported in Alzheimer's disease (AD). An SNP near GABRB2 was associated with AD. Two SNPs in GABRB2 were significantly associated with frontotemporal dementia (FTD) risk, and GABRB2 was downregulated in a cellular system of FTD and a mouse model of tauopathy.

=== Cancer ===
Genomic classifiers including GABRB2 could differentiate correctly between malignant and benign nodules. and GABRB2 alone or in combination with other genes correctly distinguished between malignant and benign tumors. GABRB2 was upregulated and hypomethylated in papillary thyroid carcinoma. The downregulation of GABRB2 enhanced the apoptotic cell death and decreased proliferation, migration, and invasiveness of thyroid cancer cells. GABRB2 was upregulated in adrenocortical carcinoma and salivary gland cancer, but downregulated in patients with colorectal cancer, brain tumors, kidney renal clear cell carcinoma and lung cancer

=== Therapeutic implications ===
The β2 subunit-containing GABAA receptors are more sensitive to GABA. Tyrosine and proline residues in the Cys-loop of this subunit were important elements in the binding and response to GABA, and the subunit also mediated the receptor binding of alcohol and anesthetics, anticonvulsive activity of loreclezole, hypothermic response to etomidate, as well as the sedative effects of both etomidate and loreclezole. It was identified as a target for the endocannabinoid 2-arachidonylglycerol, and Gabrb2 expression was upregulated by the antiepileptic drug qingyangshenylycosides and downregulated by the opioid oxycodone The wide-ranging involvement of the GABRB2 and its gene products in neuropsychiatric pharmacology are in accord with their central roles in inhibitory signaling in the brain.

== See also ==
- GABAA receptor
