= Evil Genes =

Book by Barbara Oakley

Evil Genes Why Rome Fell, Hitler Rose, Enron Failed and My Sister Stole My Mother's Boyfriend
- Hardcover edition
- Author: Barbara A. Oakley
- Language: English
- Subject: Sociology
- Genre: Non-fiction
- Publisher: Prometheus Books
- Publication date: October 31, 2008
- Publication place: United States
- Pages: 459
- ISBN: 978-1-59102-580-1

Evil Genes is a book by Barbara Oakley, a systems engineer, about the neurological and social factors contributing to chronic antisocial behavior. The text was published on October 31, 2008, by Prometheus Books.

The book has earned both praise and criticism for its treatment of what Oakley considers gaps in psychological research surrounding "successfully sinister" individuals—those who show subclinical symptoms of personality disorders, and who are often found in positions of authority in politics, religion, business, and academia.

== See also ==
- Psychopathy
- The Mask of Sanity
- Snakes in Suits: When Psychopaths Go to Work
- The Psychopath Test
