= Danielle Knafo =

American psychologist

- דניאל כנפו
- Born: French Morocco
- Occupations: Psychologist, psychoanalyst

Academic background
- Education: CUNY Graduate Center; Tel Aviv University

Academic work
- Discipline: Psychologist
- Sub-discipline: Clinical psychology
- Institutions: Long Island University
- Website: http://danielleknafo.com

Danielle Knafo (Hebrew: דניאל כנפו) is an American clinical psychologist, psychoanalyst, and author. Born in French Morocco and raised in Pennsylvania she is now a professor of psychology and psychoanalysis. She is a prolific author, and a popular speaker. She is also a professor at Long Island University-Post in its clinical psychology doctoral program. She writes and lectures on many subjects, including creativity, trauma, psychosis, sexuality and gender, and technology.

== Early life ==
Knafo was born in French Morocco and moved to the United States as a child where she spent her formative years. She moved to Israel and attended Tel Aviv University where she took a Bachelor of Arts in Literature and Psychology and a Master of Arts in Clinical Psychology. Returning to the United States, she obtained a Doctor of Philosophy at Graduate Center of the City University of New York and training in psychoanalysis at New York University.

== Academic career ==
She has also taught at a variety of academic institutions including New School for Social Research, Brooklyn College, City University of New York and City College of New York, Adelphi University, Tel Aviv University and Bar-Ilan University

She is currently a professor at Long Island University's Post campus Clinical Psychology doctoral program, where she chairs the Serious Mental Illness Specialty Concentration. She is also faculty and supervisor at the New York University postdoctoral program in psychotherapy and psychoanalysis, as well as Adelphi University's Gordon F. Derner Institute of Advanced Psychological Studies

== Publications ==
Knafo has an interest in the interrelationship between mental health and the psychology of creativity and has written several books on the subject including Dancing with the Unconscious: The Art of Psychoanalysis and the Psychoanalysis of Art, Egon Schiele: A Self in Creation: A Psychoanalytic Study of the Artist's Self-Portraits and 'In Her Own Image: Women's Self-Representation in Twentieth-Century Art. She has also written about unconscious fantasies and the effects of trauma, in Unconscious Fantasies and the Relational World and Living with Terror, Working with Trauma: A Clinician's Handbook. Other works include: Sex, Drugs and Creativity: Searching for Magic in a Disenchanted World and Becoming a Clinical Psychologist: Personal Stories of Doctoral Training Her most recent book is From Breakdown to Breakthrough: Psychoanalytic Treatment of Psychosis.

In 2016, Danielle Knafo published The Age of Perversion: Desire and Technology in Psychoanalysis and Culture. In it she explores the sea changes occurring in sexual and social life, made possible by the ongoing technological revolution, and demonstrates how psychoanalysts can understand and work with manifestations of perversion in clinical settings. In 2020, Knafo published The New Sexual Landscape and Contemporary Psychoanalysis. This book surveys modern sex culture and suggests ways psychoanalysis can update its theories and practice to meet the novel needs of today's generations.

She has also written numerous papers in academic journals such as Psychoanalytic Psychology, International Journal of Psychoanalysis, The Journal of the American Psychoanalytic Association, Psychoanalytic Review, Studies in Gender and Sexuality, American Imago, and Psychoanalytic Dialogues.
