= The Psychopath Test =

2011 book by Jon Ronson

- Hardcover edition (US)
- Author: Jon Ronson
- Language: English
- Publisher: Picador (UK); Riverhead (US)
- Publication date: 12 May 2011
- Publication place: United Kingdom; United States
- Media type: Print (hardcover); Audiobook
- Pages: 240 pp. (first edition, hardback, UK)
- ISBN: 978-1-59448-801-6

The Psychopath Test: A Journey Through the Madness Industry is a 2011 book written by British author Jon Ronson in which he explores the concept of psychopathy, along with the broader industry of mental health including mental health professionals and the mass media. It spent the whole of 2012 on United Kingdom bestseller lists and ten weeks on The New York Times Best Seller list.

== Primary themes ==
Ronson visits purported psychopaths, as well as psychologists and psychiatrists who have studied them, particularly Canadian psychologist Robert D. Hare, the eponymous author of the Hare Psychopathy Checklist, a 20‑part test administered to detect psychopathy. Ronson explores the idea that many corporate and governmental leaders are psychopaths whose actions to others can only be explained by taking that fact into account, and he privately uses the Hare test to determine if he can discern any truth to it.

He meets Toto Constant, who he speculates is a psychopath, corporate leader Albert J. Dunlap, who the magazine Fast Company speculated was a psychopath, as well as a young man detained in Broadmoor Psychiatric Hospital who states he is a victim of the psychiatric industry's unfalsifiable diagnoses.

He speaks to Anthony Maden, a professor and the forensic psychiatrist in charge of the Dangerous and Severe Personality Disorder (DSPD) unit at Broadmoor, who tells him that the controversial DSPD scheme would not have happened without Hare's checklist, adding: "Personally I don't like the way Bob Hare talks about psychopaths almost as if they are a different species" and "Even if you don't accept those criticisms of Bob Hare's work...it's obvious, if you look at his checklist, you can get a high score by being impulsive and irresponsible or by coldly planning to do something. So very different people end up with the same score."

Ronson also researches unorthodox or controversial treatments, such as nude group therapy in the 1960s or prescribing drugs for childhood bipolar disorder today.

He meets Paul Britton, the former NHS clinical psychologist and criminal profiler who had played a key part in the erroneous arrest of Colin Stagg for the murder of Rachel Nickell.

The subject of how journalistic coverage of psychopathology is pursued – and whether that pursuit itself is sociopathic – is covered as, also, are conspiracy theorists such as David Shayler.

Ultimately, Ronson raises the question of where the line can be drawn between sanity, insanity, and eccentricity. He suggests that we should not judge individuals only by their "maddest edges", or necessarily assume that 'normal' society is as rational as some might like to think; on the other hand, real and serious problems that people can have should not be dismissed because it suits an ideology (such as Scientology).

He considers the book a cautionary tale against diagnosing someone without really knowing them, and about the need to avoid confirmation bias. He thinks that is "part of the reason why there are so many miscarriages of justice in the psychopath-spotting field." He does believe that Hare's construct of psychopathy applies to some people, and that their victims deserve sympathy, but is concerned about the "alarming world of globe-trotting experts, forensic psychologists, criminal profilers, traveling the planet armed with nothing much more than a Certificate of Attendance, just like the one I had. These people might have influence inside parole hearings, death penalty hearings, serial-killer incident rooms, and on and on."

== Reception ==
The Psychopath Test was well received but also came in for criticism, largely from professional psychiatrists. Its writing style was lauded but the main criticism was a lack of depth in investigating psychopathy.

The Society for the Scientific Study of Psychopathy (SSSP) published a statement – signed by some of the scientists featured in Ronson's book, including Robert D. Hare and Essi Viding – stating that certain interviews in it were exaggerated or fictionalised and that they "think that Ronson's book trivializes a serious personality disorder and its measurement, which is not helpful to those who have the disorder or to their unfortunate victims". Others' complaints focused on Ronson's point of view which complainants thought was very one-sided throughout the book.

Dr. Hare also released a longer rebuttal of Ronson's book, stating that it trivializes the work of clinical professionals and presents psychopathy in an unrealistic and overly simplistic manner. In contrast, he thought his own books Snakes in Suits and Without Conscience were more realistic, less sensationalist and more evidence-based depictions of sociopathy and psychopathy.

== Film adaptation ==
It was announced in February 2015 that Universal Pictures and Imagine Entertainment would produce a film for adaptation of the book. Kristin Gore was set to write the screenplay adaptation, with Scarlett Johansson in a leading role and direction from Jay Roach. However, the tentative release date of 2017 has long passed and no relevant news outlets have mentioned this production since 2015.

== See also ==
- The Mask of Sanity – (1941) by Hervey Cleckley
- The Sociopath Next Door – (2005) by Martha Stout
- Snakes in Suits – (2006) by Paul Babiak and Robert D. Hare
