= Hermann Meyer-Lindenberg =

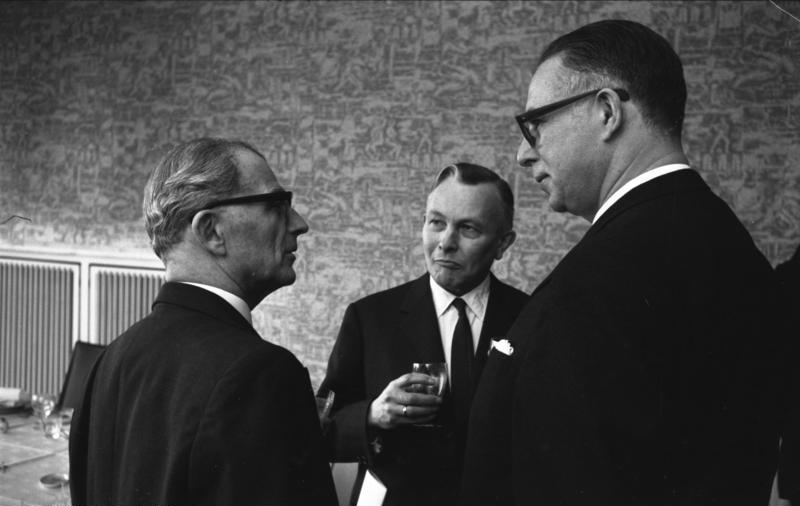
From left: Ministerial Director Dr. Günther Joel, Undersecretary Dr. Herbert Knolle, Hermann Meyer-Lindenberg

Hermann Meyer-Lindenberg (May 13, 1912, in Berlin – July 16, 1982, in Munich) was the ambassador of Germany to Spain, and ambassador to Italy.

Hermann Meyer-Lindenberg studied at the universities of Heidelberg and Berlin. The handover of government to the National Socialists forced the family to emigrate. He continued his studies at Columbia University and at the Graduate Institute of International Studies in Geneva. He received a grant from the Institute, which he used in 1936 to conduct research in several German archives, particularly in the Tyrol. Meyer-Lindenberg received his doctorate in 1935 in Geneva with a thesis on the problem of European organization and the intellectual life of the Restoration epoch. He was married to Marie-Rosa Malchia Countess Resseguier von Miremont (born November 1, 1914). They had two sons, Peter and Johannes Meyer-Lindenberg. Hermann Meyer-Lindenberg is the grandfather of Andreas Meyer-Lindenberg. In 1937 he received a professorship in international and administrative law at the Pontifical Xaveriana University in Bogotá, where he taught until 1952.

In 1954, he joined the foreign service of the Federal Republic of Germany. In 1960, he was deputy head of the legal department (Department 206) at the Foreign Office. In 1965, he became head of Department West I in the Foreign Office. From 1966 to 1968 Hermann Meyer-Lindenberg headed the Politics Department at the Federal Foreign Office.

In 1974, Meyer-Lindenberg became Germany's ambassador to Italy. He was also Germany's ambassador to Spain. On February 21, 1975, he reported on Hans-Dietrich Genscher's talks with Aldo Moro and Mariano Rumor about the PAL system.
