= Ariel Knafo-Noam =

Israeli psychologist

- אריאל כנפו-נועם
- Other names: Ariel Knafo
- Education: Hebrew University of Jerusalem
- Scientific career
- Fields: Behavior genetics; Developmental psychology
- Institutions: Hebrew University of Jerusalem
- Thesis: Value Transmission in the Family?: Processes and Contexts in the Perception and Acceptance of Parental Values by Adolescents (2001)
- Doctoral advisor: Shalom H. Schwartz

Ariel Knafo-Noam (Hebrew: אריאל כנפו-נועם) also known as Ariel Knafo, is an Israeli developmental psychologist and behavior geneticist. He is a professor in the Department of Psychology at the Hebrew University of Jerusalem, where he is also the head of the Social Development Laboratory. His research has focused on genetic and environmental contributions to prosocial behaviors such as altruism and empathy.
