= Barbara Oakley =

Professor of engineering

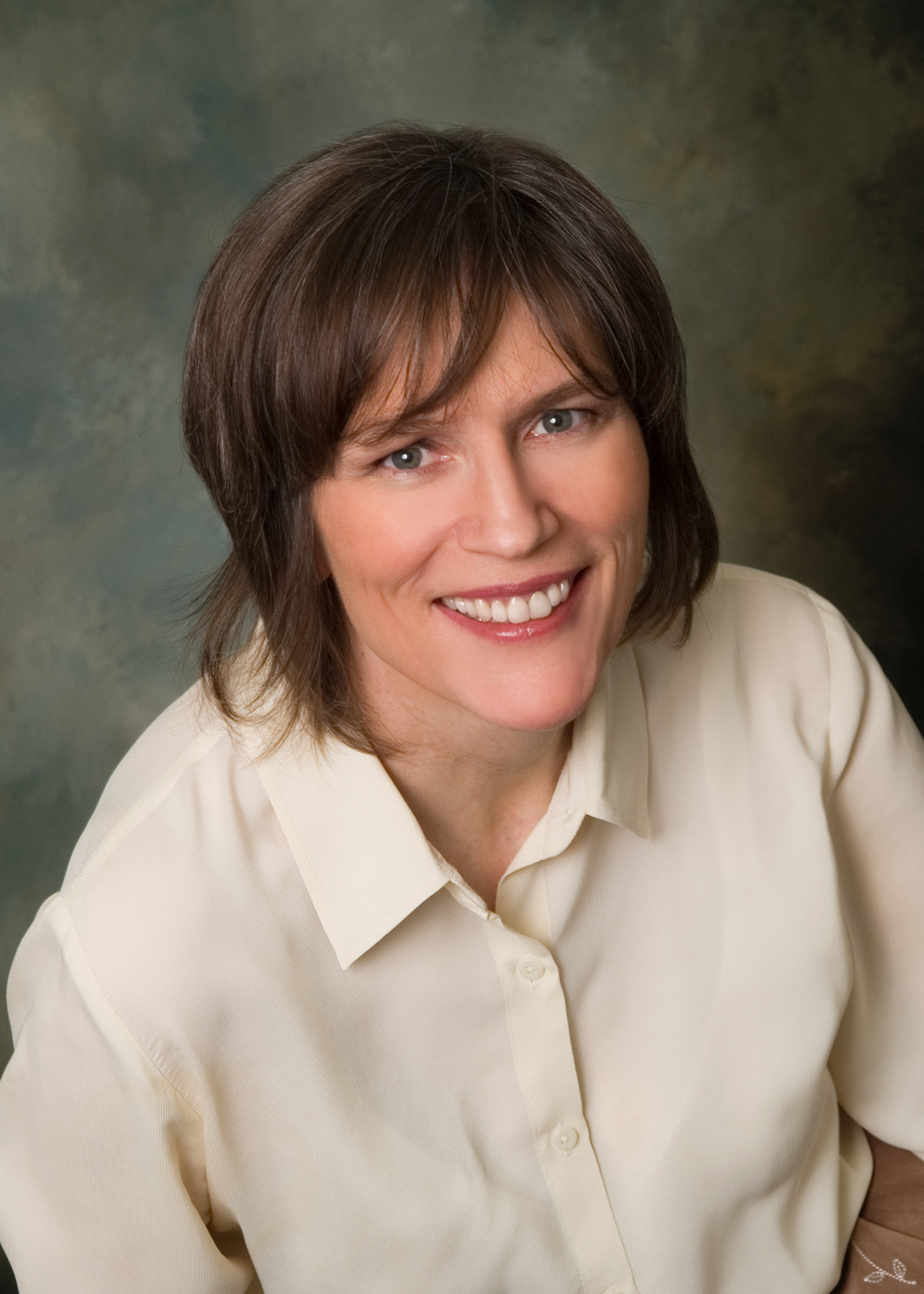
- Born: Barbara Ann Grim; November 24, 1955 (age 70); Lodi, California, United States
- Education: University of Washington; Oakland University
- Spouse: Philip Oakley (m. 1984)
- Children: 4
- Scientific career
- Fields: Engineering, learning, altruism bias
- Workplaces: Oakland University; McMaster University; Coursera
- Military career
- Allegiance: United States of America
- Branch: United States Army
- Service years: 1974–1981
- Rank: Captain
- Website: www.barbaraoakley.com

Barbara Ann Oakley (née Grim, November 24, 1955) is an American professor of engineering at Oakland University and McMaster University whose online courses on learning are some of the most popular massive open online course (MOOC) classes in the world. She is involved in multiple areas of research, ranging from STEM education to learning practices.

Oakley co-created and taught Learning How To Learn: Powerful mental tools to help you master tough subjects, the world's most popular online course. She also wrote the accompanying book, A Mind For Numbers: How to Excel at Math and Science (Even If You Flunked Algebra).

Oakley has authored op-ed articles about learning in The Wall Street Journal and The New York Times.

== Biography ==
Oakley was born in Lodi, California, in 1955 to Alfred and Constance Grim. Alfred was in the US Army Air Corps as a bomber pilot during World War II. Oakley moved frequently with her family as a child, moving to ten different places by the time she was in tenth grade.

After leaving high school, Oakley enlisted in the U.S. Army. The Army sent her to study at the University of Washington, where she completed a B.A. in Slavic languages and literature. She also received extensive training in Russian at the Defense Language Institute. Oakley served as a signal officer in Germany for four years, achieving the rank of captain.

After her Army duties ended, Oakley decided to challenge herself and see if her brain, more used to the study of languages, could be 'retooled' to study mathematical subjects. She chose to study engineering, to better understand the communications equipment she used in the US Army service. Oakley was recognized later as a Distinguished Military Scholar.

Oakley completed a B.S. in electrical engineering at the University of Washington in 1986. While she was studying for the degree, Oakley worked as a Russian translator on Soviet trawlers in the Bering Sea. She wrote a book about her experiences during this time, entitled Hair of the Dog: Tales from Aboard a Russian Trawler.

Oakley spent a season as the radio operator at the South Pole Station in Antarctica. Here she met her husband-to-be, Philip; they married on February 1, 1984. They have four children; two daughters, and two adopted sons who were previously refugees from Kosovo.

Oakley moved to Detroit with her family in 1989. She worked for Ford briefly and then attended Oakland University while doing consulting work. She received an M.S. degree in electrical and computer engineering in 1995. Oakley continued her education after that and received a Ph.D. in systems engineering in 1998.

== Academic career ==
Oakley became a professor of engineering at Oakland University in Michigan, in 1998, after graduating with a Ph.D. at the school. She continues to be a part of the Industrial and Systems Engineering Department at Oakland.

Oakley participates in several areas of research including STEM education, engineering education, general learning, online learning, MOOCs and their effects, and studies of empathy and altruism.

Oakley co-created, with neuroscientist Terry Sejnowski, and teaches Learning How to Learn: Powerful mental tools to help you master tough subjects, a MOOC offered on Coursera. Structured with four modules, the course covers access to experts’ learning methods of various disciplines, certain functions of the brain, and other researched tactics proven to be effective in gaining skill with challenging subjects. The course had its first three runs in August and October 2014 and January 2015, when it attracted approximately 300,000 students in total. The course is now available in on-demand format. A total of more than 4 million students have enrolled as of June, 2025.

Oakley has authored numerous books including NY Times bestsellers and several have been translated into many languages. She describes the use of neuroscience tools to help students improve their learning.

== Awards ==
Oakley was recognized as an elected IEEE Fellow of Education Society, won the IEEE Willaim E. Sayle II Award for Achievement in Education in 2020. In 2021, Academicinfluence.com named Oakley as a "highly influential woman in engineering". Oakley was awarded the Harold W. McGraw, Jr. Prize in Education in 2023. The American Association for the Advancement of Science elected Oakley as a Fellow in 2025.

== Works ==
- Uncommon Sense Teaching: Practical Insights in Brain Science to Help Students Learn, by Barbara Oakley, Beth Rogowsky, Terrence J. Sejnowski. TarcherPerigee, 2021
- Learning How to Learn: How to Succeed in School Without Spending All Your Time Studying; A Guide for Kids and Teens, by Barbara Oakley and Terry Sejnowski, with Alistair McConville, Tarcher-Penguin, August 2018.
- Mindshift: Break Through Obstacles to Learning and Discover Your Hidden Potential, by Barbara Oakley. TarcherPerigee 2017.
- A Mind for Numbers, by Barbara Oakley, Tarcher-Penguin, July 2014. A New York Times best-selling science book.
- Practicing Sustainability, edited by Guruprasad Madhavan, Barbara Oakley, David Green, David Koon, and Penny Low. Springer, October, 2012. Selected for a 2013 Nautilus Silver Book Award.
- Pathological Altruism Eds Barbara Oakley, Ariel Knafo, Guruprasad Madhavan, David Sloan Wilson, Oxford University Press, January 2012.
- Cold-Blooded Kindness, by Barbara Oakley, Prometheus Books, April 2011.
- Career Development in Bioengineering and Biotechnology, Eds. Guruprasad Madhavan, Barbara Oakley, Luis Kun, Springer, 2008.
- Evil Genes: Why Rome Fell, Hitler Rose, Enron Failed, and My Sister Stole My Mother's Boyfriend, by Barbara Oakley, Prometheus Books. October, 2007.
- Hair of the Dog: Tales from Aboard a Russian Trawler, Barbara Oakley, WSU Press, 1996.
