= Glenn D. Walters =

Glenn Walters
- Born: Glenn Daryl Walters
- Education: Lebanon Valley College (B.A., 1976); Indiana University of Pennsylvania (M.A., 1978); Texas Tech University (Ph.D., 1982)
- Scientific career
- Fields: Criminology; Forensic psychology
- Institutions: Kutztown University
- Thesis: Racial variations on the MacAndrew alcoholism scale of the MMPI (1982)

Glenn Walters is an American forensic psychologist and associate professor of Criminal Justice at Kutztown University in Pennsylvania. He worked for three decades in federal government as a clinical psychologist and drug program coordinator for military and federal prison inmates. He has published widely in criminology, including addiction.

He has developed a Psychological Inventory of Criminal Thinking Styles (PICTS). He argues that criminality is best understood and prevented by examining how it develops within the context of a person's life, and has critiqued genetic studies via metaanalytic research.

His earlier work focused on recidivist criminals within the justice system with failed lives, describing them as lazy and motivated primarily be fear; it has been pointed out that this does not seem to apply to those who manage to be successful, particularly those in organized crime.

Walters has more recently sought to develop an overarching explanation of why any person develops into a certain lifestyle - a patterned set of rules, roles, rituals and relationships - described as falling within four broad groupings: leader, follower, rebel, and disabled.
