= Jim Tucker (journalist) =

American journalist

- Born: James P. Tucker, Jr. December 31, 1934; Charlotte, North Carolina, U.S.
- Died: April 26, 2013 (aged 78); Fredericksburg, Virginia, U.S.
- Occupation: Journalist
- Children: 2
- Writing career
- Language: English
- Subjects: Council on Foreign Relations, Trilateral Commission, Bilderbergers
- Notable work: Jim Tucker's Bilderberg Diary

James P. Tucker Jr. (December 31, 1934 – April 26, 2013), also known as Big Jim Tucker, was an American journalist and author of Jim Tucker's Bilderberg Diary who began to focus on the Bilderberg Group in 1975.

Tucker has been described as a "veteran Bilderberg observer", "the doyen of Bilderberg hunters", as "an oddball Washington journalist", and as a "right-wing conspiracy investigator".

== Career ==
=== Journalism ===
Tucker was a sports journalist with a newspaper in Washington from 1975 until his death.

Tucker started writing for the populist newspaper The Spotlight in 1975, and continued as a contributor until its closure in 2001. Shortly after the paper's closure, Tucker and many former Spotlight employees founded the similarly toned American Free Press.

=== Bilderberg Group ===
==== 1990s ====
Tucker said he was able to write the "advance story" on the downfall of Margaret Thatcher, as well as the rise of Bill Clinton, after he attended the Bilderberg meeting at Baden-Baden in Germany in 1991. He claimed Thatcher was removed from office because she "didn't like it [the Bilderberg group]" and that as a result they "replaced her" with a trapeze artist John Major from the same party". According to Tucker's "close paraphrasing" of a conversation some years later, Thatcher told him it was "a tribute to be denounced by them" at a function in Washington. Thatcher actually attended at least three Bilderberg meetings.

Tucker's efforts to infiltrate the 1999 Bilderberg meeting at the Hotel Caesar Park in Sintra, Portugal were chronicled by British reporter Jon Ronson in his book Them: Adventures with Extremists. The infiltration was also broadcast as part of Channel 4's The Secret Rulers of the World series. Tucker told Ronson "[t]hey exist and they're not playing pinochle in there."

==== 2000s ====
In 2005, Tucker wrote Jim Tucker's Bilderberg Diary, published by the American Free Press – where he was an editor. The book chronicled his thirty-plus years of investigations into the Bilderberg Group.

After the 2006 Bilderberg meeting in Ottawa, Tucker claimed that he "was able to report that in the year ahead many hundreds of thousands of American home owners would lose their homes". Tucker said a Bilderberg attendee remarked "the stupid jerks deserve it" while another responded to the comment by saying "[t]hat's awful cruel".

Tucker is featured prominently in a 2007 film made by radio host Alex Jones, Endgame: Blueprint for Global Enslavement, which partially deals with the 2006 Bilderberg conference at the Brookstreet Hotel in Ottawa, Ontario. Similarly, both Tucker and Jones are featured in the 2009 documentary film, New World Order. Charlie Skelton encountered Tucker in 2009 while researching that year's Bilderberg.

And then, on the pavement ahead, there he was. I recognised him from the videos. The braces, the loose shirt, the grizzle. The tattered leather briefcase, packed with dark secrets. It was the doyen of Bilderberg hunters himself, Jim Tucker.

— Charlie Skelton in The Guardian on 13 May 2009.

== Personal life and death ==
Tucker lived in the Washington, D.C. area after first moving there in 1975. He passed away on April 26, 2013, after a fall in his home.
