= The Secret Rulers of the World =

2001 documentary series by Jon Ronson

- Genre: Documentary
- Created by: Jon Ronson
- Based on: Them: Adventures with Extremists by Jon Ronson
- Presented by: Jon Ronson
- Country of origin: United Kingdom
- Original language: English
- No. of seasons: 1
- No. of episodes: 5

Production
- Production company: World of Wonder

Original release
- Network: Channel 4

The Secret Rulers of the World is a five-part documentary television series produced by World of Wonder and written, directed by, and featuring Jon Ronson. It was first shown on the British Channel 4 in April and May 2001. The series details Ronson's encounters with conspiracy theorists and accompanies his 2001 book Them: Adventures with Extremists, which covers similar topics and describes many of the same events.

== Part 1: "The Legend of Ruby Ridge" ==
Original air date: 29 April 2001

Ronson meets with Randy Weaver and his daughter Rachel, two surviving members of the Weaver family. The film shows previously unseen archive footage to describe the life of a family who claim to have moved to a cabin in Ruby Ridge, Idaho, to live peacefully and escape what they see as the tyrannical elite of international bankers bent on enslaving the world. Ronson also explains how the Weaver family's conspiracy theories became a shocking tragedy when U.S. Marshals killed two of the family members, their dog, and shot and wounded Randy Weaver and Kevin Harris, whom the Weaver family considered their son. Ronson explores the unsympathetic media response to the killings and how this incident might have influenced the siege at Waco, the Oklahoma City bombing, and the growth of the American militia movement.

== Part 2: "David Icke, the Lizards and the Jews" ==
Original air date: 6 May 2001

Ronson follows David Icke as he promotes his theory that "the elite are genetically descended from a race of 12-foot, blood-drinking, shapeshifting lizards". During the film, Icke is accused by a leftist protest group (including Richard Warman, lawyer and former Green Party of Canada candidate) in Canada of antisemitism. The documentary explores the theme of whether Icke literally means lizards—as he steadfastly maintains—or whether the reptilians are a coded reference to Jews, an assertion that Icke vehemently denies. Ronson concludes that Icke is probably not an antisemite and comes to have misgivings about the Icke protesters' methods and their attempts to silence Icke.

== Part 3: "Timothy McVeigh, the Oklahoma Bomber" ==
Original air date: 13 May 2001

Before his involvement in the Oklahoma City bombing, Timothy McVeigh believed that a shadowy elite secretly controlled the governments of the world, conspiring to establish a genocidal New World Order. He believed that the Alfred P. Murrah building in Oklahoma City was a local New World Order headquarters. But many other theorists are convinced that the world only knows part of an apparent complex conspiracy story behind the bombing. Ronson meets a number of theorists whilst investigating the story and concludes his film in Elohim City, a private Christian Identity movement compound in Oklahoma.

== Part 4: "The Satanic Shadowy Elite?" ==
Original air date: 20 May 2001

Ronson follows conspiracy theorist and radio host Alex Jones as Jones attempts to infiltrate the annual gathering of dignitaries and business leaders (reportedly including George W. Bush and Henry Kissinger) at the Bohemian Grove. The film includes footage of attendees dressed in robes and burning an effigy at the foot of a giant stone owl. Jones believes that the ceremony is related to occult secret societies. After the event, Ronson meets comedy actor and fellow attendee Harry Shearer, who describes the event as a glorified fraternity party. Shearer largely dismisses Jones's dramatic retelling of the gathering and notes that the music is supplied by the Symphony Orchestra of San Francisco.

== Part 5: "The Bilderberg Group" ==
Original air date: 27 May 2001

Ronson teams up with reporter James P. Tucker Jr., who has been investigating the Bilderberg Group, an annual invitation-only conference, for over thirty years. According to Tucker, around 130 guests, most of whom are persons of influence in business, academic, or political circles, meet annually in secret. The duo encounters unwelcoming security men and a car chase. Ronson also interviews group founder Denis Healey.
