= Endgame (2007 film) =

Endgame: Blueprint for Global Enslavement
- Endgame DVD cover
- Directed by: Alex Jones
- Written by: Alex Jones
- Produced by: Alex Jones
- Narrated by: Alex Jones
- Edited by: Alex Jones; Rob Jacobson
- Music by: Graham Reynolds
- Production companies: Magnolia Management; Alex Jones Productions
- Distributed by: Disinformation Company (2007 US DVD)
- Release date: November 1, 2007
- Running time: 139 minutes
- Country: United States
- Language: English

Endgame: Blueprint for Global Enslavement is a 2007 documentary film directed by Alex Jones. The film explores various conspiracy theories, focusing on the idea that a secretive elite group is working towards establishing a New World Order to achieve global control and enslavement. It discusses topics such as eugenics, population control, and the loss of national sovereignty, and it presents historical and contemporary events as evidence supporting these theories. The film combines interviews, archival footage, and Jones' commentary to argue that global institutions and powerful individuals are manipulating political and economic systems for their benefit at the expense of individual freedoms and national independence.

== Content ==
In the film, Alex Jones presents his claim of a eugenics-obsessed group leading the world, whose mission is the elimination of most of the Earth's population and the enslavement of the remainder. He claims that an international network has been "steering planetary affairs for hundreds of years." and that fundamental theories of eugenics are used by governments as a form of control.

== Cast ==
- Jim Tucker
- Daniel Estulin
- Alex Jones
- Rob Jacobson

== Critical reception ==
Glenn Erickson of DVD Talk wrote that the film is "so obnoxious and pernicious, it's scary", and found that "Endgame instead sells a wild and moronic conspiracy fantasy with something to offer every malcontent and paranoid on the planet." The Courier Online described it as, "...conspiracy ridden... written and directed by professional nutter Alex Jones."
