= Lost at Sea =

Lost at Sea may refer to:

- Castaway
- List of people who disappeared mysteriously at sea

== Music ==
- Lost @ Sea, a 1998 album by The Lads
- Lost at Sea, a 2005 album by Bounding Main
- Lost at Sea (album), a 2001 album by Craig's Brother
- "Lost at Sea", a track on the album Standing Stone (1997) by Paul McCartney
- "Lost at Sea", a track from the album Clarity (2013) by Zedd featuring Ryan Tedder
- "Sæglópur" (Icelandic for "lost at sea"), a track in the album Takk... (2005) by Sigur Ros

== Print ==
- Lost at Sea, a 2003 graphic novel by Bryan Lee O'Malley
- Lost at Sea: The Jon Ronson Mysteries, a 2012 novel by Jon Ronson

== Film and television ==
- Lost at Sea (film), a lost 1926 silent film directed by Louis J. Gasnier
- "Lost at Sea" (NCIS), a 2012 episode of TV series NCIS
- "Lost at Sea", an hour-long episode of the Disney Channel Original Series The Suite Life on Deck
