= Ernst van der Beugel =

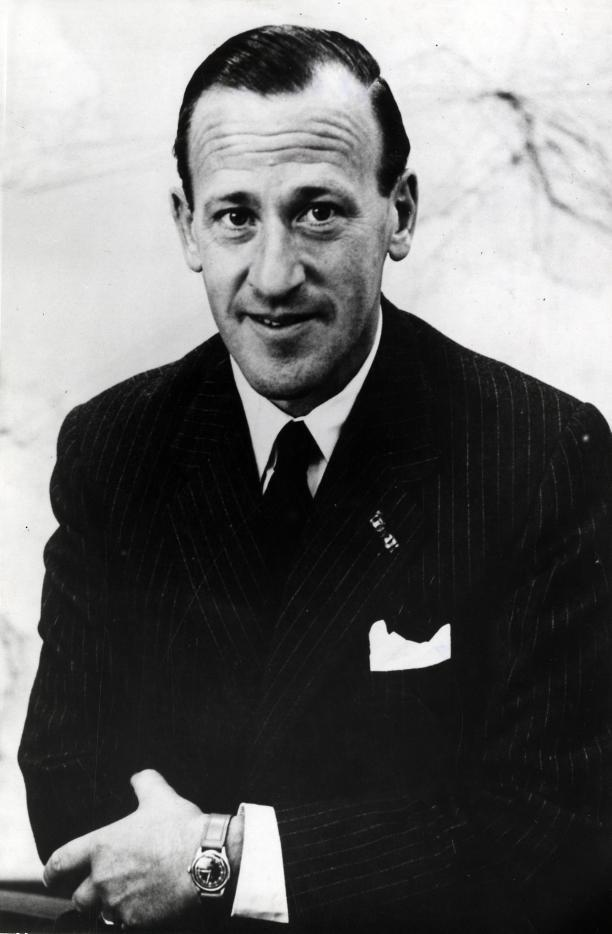
Van der Beugel

Ernst van der Beugel (Dutch pronunciation: [ˈɛr(ə)nst fɑn dər ˈbøːɣəl]; 2 February 1918, Amsterdam – 29 September 2004, The Hague) was a Dutch economist, businessman, diplomat, and politician of the Labour Party.

== Education ==
Van der Beugel graduated in economics from the University of Amsterdam in 1941 and received a Ph.D. from Erasmus University Rotterdam in 1966 on the dissertation From Marshall plan to Atlantic Partnership (with a foreword of Henry A. Kissinger).

== Life's work ==
In 1945 he joined the Dutch Ministry of Transport, moving to the Ministry of Economic affairs in 1946. In 1947 he was Secretary to the Dutch national delegation at the first Paris conference on the Marshall Plan. Between 1957 and 1958 he was statesecretary for foreign affairs for the Labour Party in the fourth Cabinet Drees. He took over as permanent secretary of the Bilderberg Group in 1960, upon the death of Józef Retinger. From 1961 to 1963 he was president of Dutch airline KLM. From 1966 to 1984 he was professor of international relations at Leiden University.

== Family ==
His sister was the author and journalist Ina van der Beugel (1914–2003).

== Publications ==
- Albertine Bloemendal: Reframing the Diplomat. Ernst van der Beugel and the Cold War Atlantic Community. Leiden, Brill, 2018. ISBN 9789004359178 (Partly open access)
