= Stanley Kubrick's Boxes =

2008 film

- Written by: Jon Ronson
- Directed by: Jon Ronson
- Starring: Anthony Frewin; Anya Kubrick; Christiane Kubrick; Stanley Kubrick; Jon Ronson; Vincent Tilsley; Leon Vitali
- Music by: Simon Fisher Turner
- Country of origin: United Kingdom
- Original language: English

Production
- Producer: Jess Ludgrove
- Cinematography: David Barker; David Kempner; Brian O'Carroll
- Editor: Kieran Smyth
- Running time: 48 minutes
- Production companies: World of Wonder; Channel 4

Original release
- Release: 15 July 2008

Stanley Kubrick's Boxes is a 2008 British TV documentary film directed and written by Jon Ronson about the film director Stanley Kubrick. It was produced by World of Wonder for Channel 4.

== Synopsis ==
Jon Ronson visits Stanley Kubrick's estate over a five-year period, and explores the contents of some of the thousands of custom-made cardboard boxes containing Kubrick's film-making memorabilia. The documentary comprises interviews with Kubrick's family and colleagues, and features examples of the boxes' contents, which include research materials and notes for Kubrick's released films and unrealised projects as well as meticulously archived and indexed fan letters.

== Cast ==
In order of appearance:

- Jon Ronson
- Stanley Kubrick (archive footage)
- Anthony Frewin
- Jan Harlan
- Christiane Kubrick
- Anya Kubrick
- Julian Senior
- Vincent Tilsley
- Rick Senat
- Deborah Davis
- Judy Tobey
- Bernd Eichhorn
- Leon Vitali

== Reception ==
Derek Elley wrote in Variety: "Packed with some new, and some familiar, insights into Kubrick’s meticulous, obsessive mind, and revealing a very human side of the reclusive helmer, pic deserves extensive fest play as well as cable airings. ... Technically, docu is basic stuff, though copious clips are well integrated and Kieran Smyth’s photo montages pack in a lot of archival detail. Simon Fisher Turner’s atmospheric score builds an air of mystery and discovery."

In Empire, Ian Nathan wrote: "In Jon Ronson's marvellous TV documentary, Stanley Kubrick's Boxes, the journalist was given rare access to the director's archive still stored at his Childwickbury Manor after his death in 1999. ... Ronson wryly notes that his (mostly unfair) reputation as a mad recluse might have been fuelled by weekly visits to Harpenden's Ryman to purchase any new lines of stationery they might have had delivered. In amongst the archive was what amounted to a Ryman museum, made up of pristine pads, notebooks and sheaves of paper. And yet Ronson's conclusion was inspiring. In material form, here were the inner-workings of Kubrick's creativity, the clockwork his genius."

The Times wrote: "A cineaste’s treasure trove indeed, and for Ronson an excuse to meet Kubrick confidantes to hear personal experiences of the director’s film-making foibles and pursuit of artistic perfection. A curious insight into cinema’s great enigma."

In Sight and Sound Georgina Orgill, Head of the Kubrick Archive, wrote: "Kubrick was very interested in archiving. Before his collection came to us it was kept at the Kubrick estate. There was a bit of damp, but it was very well looked after – he had ordered boxes to house it, it wasn't just dumped on a shelf. The documentary Stanley Kubrick's Boxes (2008) shows this well."

The Glasgow Herald wrote: "The insight ... offered into Stanley Kubrick's mind by way of boxes, more boxes and then some more boxes of, well, stuff, was utterly compelling."

In Sight and Sound, Linda Ruth Williams called the film a "hilarious, access-all-areas documentary."
