= Out of the Ordinary =

Book by Jon Ronson

Out of the Ordinary: True Tales of Everyday Craziness
- Author: Jon Ronson
- Language: English
- Publisher: Picador
- Publication date: 2006

Out of the Ordinary: True Tales of Everyday Craziness is British journalist Jon Ronson's fourth book. The essays in Out of the Ordinary were first published in The Guardian. The pieces in Out of the Ordinary are mostly about Ronson's domestic life.

== Contents ==
The book is divided into three parts. In part one, Ronson describes his parents commissioning an artist to paint a family portrait, a trip to meet Santa with his son Joel, almost finding God, and a diary-style recasting of Ronson's "Out of the Ordinary" Guardian column.

Part two consists of a pair of essays about the court system—the "Who Wants to Be A Millionaire" trial surrounding a sound expert's allegations that 36 coughs were made by one person during an episode of the show supposedly won by cheats and the case of Jonathan King, who responded to charges that he sexually molested underage boys by comparing himself to Oscar Wilde.

Part three is about celebrities.

== Reception ==
A Times Literary Supplement brief of Out of the Ordinary summarized, "if there is a unifying theme to these pieces then it is that we are all capable of misplaced zeal and irrationality—and that the gaps between the socially awkward and the sociopath are not as wide as we might think."

Ronson's prose in Out of the Ordinary is characterized by self-mockery, what the Times calls his "charming buffoonery": he writes about having a panic attack when dressed up as Santa for his son. Parents, he says, "are like amateur bomb-disposal officers, forever cutting the wrong wires".
