= Frank: The True Story That Inspired the Movie =

2014 book by Jon Ronson

- First edition
- Author: Jon Ronson
- Genre: Non-fiction
- Publisher: Picador
- Publication date: 2014

Frank: The True Story that Inspired the Movie is a 2014 non-fiction book by Jon Ronson, which describes his time with musician/comedian Frank Sidebottom as a keyboardist in his band in the late 1980s, as well as the inception of the 2014 movie Frank, for which he co-wrote the script.
