= Daniel Estulin =

Lithuanian-born conspiracy theorist

- Born: August 29, 1966 (age 60); Vilnius, Lithuanian SSR, Soviet Union
- Occupations: Writer, investigator
- Years active: 1999–present
- Website: english.danielestulin.com

Daniel Estulin (born August 29, 1966) is a Lithuanian-born conspiracy theorist whose main interest is the Bilderberg Group, an annual invitation-only conference of the elites in the fields of business, finance, media, military and politics. He is known for his extensive works on this group, having written a book called "The True Story of the Bilderberg Group", as well as for his live seminars throughout the world. Estulin wrote The True Story of the Bilderberg Group (original title: La Verdadera Historia del Club Bilderberg), purportedly a report on the nature and meetings of the world’s most powerful people. According to Estulin's book, the secretive Bilderbergers have been making major political, economical and social decisions since their first gathering in 1954.

Commenting on an episode in this book, Bruce Ramsey wrote "The method here is to initiate the reader into a special group of in-the-know; of mixing facts with assertions so that the casual reader won’t tell them apart, and to draw lines between A and B, when A is the person you want to impeach and B is a known wickedness."

Estulin published a second book, Los secretos del club Bilderberg, released in September 2006, described by Fidel Castro as a "fantastic story". On August 19, 2010, the Cuban state news agency Prensa Latina published the full text of a "reflection" by former President Fidel Castro which was devoted to quoting Estulin from Los secretos del club Bilderberg, on the topic of "The World Government." The selected quotes from Estulin's book focused on material credited to Lyndon LaRouche and members of his movement.

Italian MEP Mario Borghezio invited Estulin to address the European Parliament in 2011.

== Bibliography ==
=== English-language books ===
- The True Story of the Bilderberg Group. 2007. Revised and Expanded North American Union Edition 2009. Updated and Expanded edition 2017. Walterville, OR, USA: Trine Day. 2009. ISBN 978-0-9799886-2-2. OCLC 223910265..
- Shadow Masters: How Governments And Their Intelligence Agencies Are Working With Drug Dealers And Terrorists For Mutual Benefit And Profit. Walterville, OR, USA: Trine Day. 2010. ISBN 978-0-9799886-1-5. OCLC 262887238.
- Deconstructing Wikileaks. Walterville, OR, USA: Trine Day. 2012. ISBN 978-1937584115.
- The Octopus Deception: A Novel. Walterville, OR, USA: Trine Day. 2013. ISBN 978-1937584238.
- TransEvolution: The Coming Age of Human Deconstruction. Walterville, OR, USA: Trine Day. 2014. ISBN 978-1937584771.
- Tavistock Institute: Social Engineering the Masses. Waterville, OR, USA: Trine Day. 2015 ISBN 978-1634240437.
- In the Shadows of a Presidency. Walterville, OR, USA: Trine Day. 2018. ISBN 978-1634242028.

=== Spanish-language books ===
- La verdadera historia del Club Bilderberg. Barcelona, Spain: Ediciones del Bronce. 2005. ISBN 978-84-8453-157-9. OCLC 63698227.
- Los secretos del club Bilderberg. Barcelona, Spain: Ediciones del Bronce. 2006. ISBN 978-84-8453-168-5. OCLC 71820977.
- Los señores de las sombras : la verdad sobre el tejido de intereses ocultos que decide el destino del mundo. Barcelona, Spain: Ediciones del Bronce. 2007. ISBN 978-84-8453-175-3. OCLC 180755167.
- Conspiracion Octopus / Octopus Conspiracy. Barcelona, Spain: Ediciones del Bronce. 2010. ISBN 978-84-8453-157-9. OCLC 607977409.
- Desmontando a Wikileaks. Barcelona, Spain: Planeta. 2011. ISBN 978-84-8453-193-7. OCLC 758990596.
- El instituto Tavistock. Barcelona, Spain: Ediciones B. 2012. ISBN 978-84-9872-786-9. OCLC 753635042.

=== DVD video ===
- Shadow government: how the global elite plan to destroy democracy and your freedom, by Grant R Jeffrey; Katherine Albrecht; Edward G Griffin; Daniel Estulin; Gary Kah; Chuck Missler; Joan Veon; Bradley S O'Leary. Publisher: United States: Cloud Ten Pictures, 2009. OCLC 466168154.
