= Alex Jones =

American far-right conspiracy theorist (born 1974)

- Jones in 2024
- Born: Alexander Emerick Jones; February 11, 1974 (age 52); Dallas, Texas, U.S.
- Occupation: Political commentator
- Years active: 1993–present
- Known for: Infowars; The Alex Jones Show; Conspiracy theories; Sandy Hook Elementary School shooting litigation
- Spouses: Kelly Jones (m. 2007; div. 2015); Erika Wulff (m. 2017; div. 2024)
- Children: 4

Alexander Emerick Jones (born February 11, 1974) is an American far-right political commentator and conspiracy theorist. Since at least 2000, he has hosted The Alex Jones Show from Austin, Texas, originally broadcast by the Genesis Communications Network across the United States via AM radio syndication and internet. He is the founder of Infowars and Banned.Video, websites that promote conspiracy theories and fake news. Jones is regarded as one of the most prominent conspiracy theorists in the U.S. (Note: New York magazine has described Jones as "America's leading conspiracy theorist", and the Southern Poverty Law Center describes him as "the most prolific conspiracy theorist in contemporary America".)

Among many other conspiracy theories, Jones has alleged that the United States government either concealed information about or outright falsified the Sandy Hook Elementary School shooting, the Parkland high school shooting, the Oklahoma City bombing, and the September 11 attacks. He has also claimed that several governments and large businesses have colluded to create a globalist "New World Order" through "manufactured economic crises, sophisticated surveillance tech and—above all—inside-job terror attacks that fuel exploitable hysteria". Jones has provided a platform for white nationalists and neo-Nazis on his website Banned.Video, as well as providing an "entry point" to their ideology.

A longtime critic of Republican and Democratic foreign and security policy, Jones supported Donald Trump's 2016 presidential bid and continued to support him as a savior from an alleged criminal bipartisan cabal controlling the federal government, despite also falling out with Trump over several of his policies, including airstrikes against the Assad regime. A staunch supporter of Trump's re-election, Jones also supported the attempts to overturn the 2020 United States presidential election. On January 6, 2021, Jones was a speaker at the rally in Lafayette Square Park supporting Trump that preceded the latter's supporters' attack on the US Capitol. In 2026, Jones once again fell out with Trump over his disagreements with the Iran war, criticizing the intervention as contrary to the "America First" message.

In October 2022, for Jones's defamatory falsehoods about the Sandy Hook shooting, juries in Connecticut and Texas awarded a total of $1.487 billion in damages from Jones to a first responder and families of victims; the plaintiffs alleged that Jones's lies led to them being threatened and harassed for years. On December 2, 2022, Jones filed for personal bankruptcy. After three years of litigation, the U.S. Supreme Court rejected Jones's appeal without comment.

== Early life and influences ==
Alexander Emerick Jones was born on February 11, 1974, in Dallas, Texas, and was raised in Rockwall, 25 miles (40 km) east of Dallas. His father was a dentist from Austin and his mother was a homemaker. He says he has English, German, Scottish, and Irish descent. The family moved to Austin in Jones's second year of high school. He attended Anderson High School, where he played football and graduated in 1993. After graduating, Jones briefly attended Austin Community College before dropping out.

As a teenager, he read None Dare Call It Conspiracy, a book by John Birch Society conspiracy theorist Gary Allen, which alleged global bankers, rather than elected officials, controlled American politics. It had a profound influence on him, and Jones has described Allen's work as "the easiest-to-read primer on The New World Order".

=== Waco siege and Oklahoma bombing ===
The Waco siege at the Branch Davidian complex near Waco, Texas, had an impact on Jones. It ended in April 1993, near the end of Jones's senior year of high school, with a substantial fire and a significant number of fatalities. According to the Southern Poverty Law Center (SPLC), these events "only confirmed his belief in the inexorable progress of unseen, malevolent forces". It was at this time he started to host a call-in show on public access television (PACT/ACTV) in Austin.

The Oklahoma City bombing on April 19, 1995, was intended by perpetrator Timothy McVeigh as a response to the federal involvement in the botched resolution of the Waco siege on its second anniversary. Jones began accusing the federal government of having caused it: "I understood there's a kleptocracy working with psychopathic governments—clutches of evil that know the tricks of control". He did not believe the bombing had been the responsibility of McVeigh and his associate Terry Nichols.

In 1998, Jones organized a successful campaign to build a new Branch Davidian church as a memorial to those who died during the 1993 fire. He often discussed the project on his public-access television program. He claimed that David Koresh and his followers were peaceful people who were murdered by Attorney General Janet Reno and the Bureau of Alcohol, Tobacco, and Firearms during the siege.

== Early broadcasting career ==
Jones began his career in Austin working on a live, call-in format public-access cable television program. In 1996, Jones switched to radio, hosting a show named The Final Edition on KJFK (98.9 FM). Influenced by radio host William Cooper, who phoned in to Jones's early shows, Jones began to broadcast about the New World Order conspiracy theory at this time.

While running for Congress, Ron Paul was a guest on his show several times. In 1999, Jones tied with Shannon Burke for that year's poll of "Best Austin Talk Radio Host", as voted by readers of The Austin Chronicle. Later that year, he was fired from KJFK-FM for refusing to broaden his topics. The station's operations manager said that Jones's views made it difficult for the station to sell advertising. Jones said:

It was purely political, and it came down from on high ... I was told 11 weeks ago to lay off Bill Clinton, to lay off all these politicians, to not talk about rebuilding the church, to stop bashing the Marines, A to Z.

== InfoWars ==
InfoWars logo

NewsWars logo

In 1999, Jones founded with his wife, Kelly Jones, the website InfoWars, initially as a mail-order outlet for the sale of their conspiracy-oriented videos. Jones used the company to release films, such as America Destroyed by Design and America Wake Up Or Waco. Over time, InfoWars, with Jones as its publisher and director, became a prominent fake news website centered on promoting conspiracy theories. In November 2016, the InfoWars website received approximately 10 million visits, making its reach more extensive than mainstream news websites such as The Economist and Newsweek. Jones's used to run PrisonPlanet.com, which is now owned by an online casino.

=== The Alex Jones Show ===
After his firing from KJFK-FM, Jones began to broadcast his own show by Internet connection from his home. In July 2000, a group of Austin Community Access Center (ACAC) radio hosts claimed that Jones had used legal proceedings and ACAC policy to intimidate them or try to get their broadcasts removed. In 2001, Jones's radio show was syndicated on approximately 100 stations.

On the day of the 9/11 attacks, Jones said on his radio show there was a "98 percent chance this was a government-orchestrated controlled bombing". He began promoting the conspiracy theory that the Bush administration was behind the attack. As a result, several stations dropped Jones's program, according to columnist Will Bunch. Jones became a leading figure of the "9/11 truther" cause. In 2010, the show attracted around two million listeners each week. According to Alexander Zaitchik of Rolling Stone magazine, in 2011 Jones had a larger on-line audience than Glenn Beck and Rush Limbaugh combined. In 2020, The Alex Jones Show was syndicated nationally by the Genesis Communications Network to more than 100 AM and FM radio stations in the United States.

According to journalist Will Bunch, a senior fellow at Media Matters for America, the show has a demographic that leans more towards younger listeners than do other conservative pundits, due to Jones's "highly conspiratorial tone and Web-oriented approach". Bunch also stated that Jones "feed[s] on the deepest paranoia".

Jones told The Washington Post in November 2016 that his radio show, then syndicated to 129 stations, had a daily audience of five million listeners and his video streams had topped 80 million viewers in a single month.

Jones's syndicator, Genesis Communications Network, announced its shutdown effective May 5, 2024, citing financial losses.

=== Website, own-brand and endorsed products ===
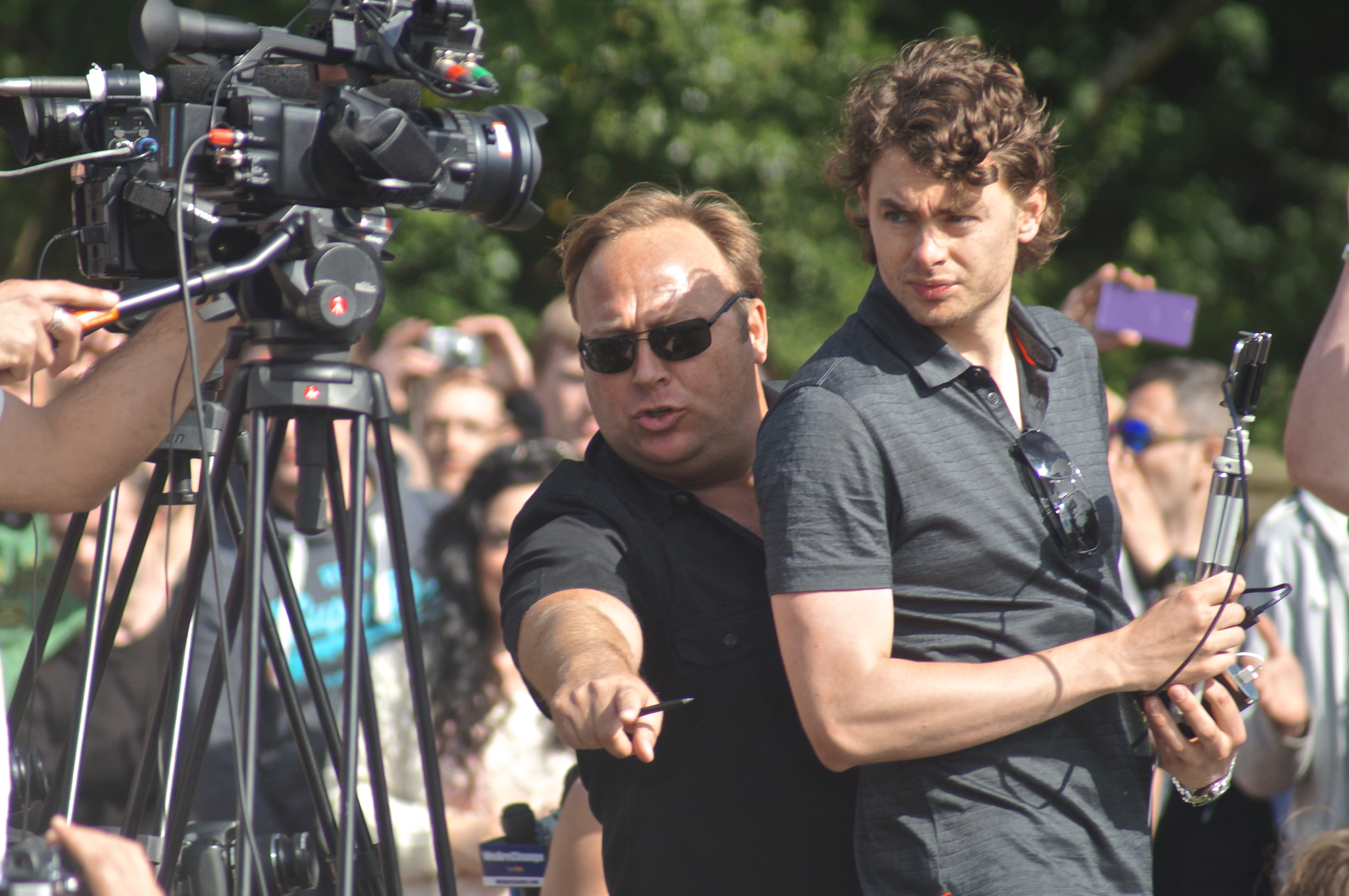
Jones with Paul Joseph Watson in 2013

According to court testimony Jones delivered in 2014, InfoWars then had revenues of over $20 million a year.

A 2017 piece for German magazine Der Spiegel by Veit Medick indicated that two-thirds of Jones's funds derive from sales of his own products. These products are marketed through the InfoWars website and through advertising spots on Jones's show. They include dietary supplements, toothpaste, bulletproof vests and "brain pills", which hold "an appeal for anyone who believes Armageddon is near", according to Medick. From September 2015 to the end of 2018, the InfoWars store made $165 million in sales, according to court filings relating to the Sandy Hook lawsuits filed against Jones.

In August 2017, Californian medical company Labdoor, Inc reported on tests applied to six of Jones's dietary supplement products. These included a product named Survival Shield, which was found by Labdoor to contain only iodine, and a product named Oxy-Powder, which comprised a compound of magnesium oxide and citric acid—common ingredients in dietary supplements. Labdoor indicated no evidence of prohibited or harmful substances, but cast doubt on the marketing claims for these products, and asserted that the quantity of the ingredients in certain products would be "too low to be appropriately effective".

On a 2017 segment of Last Week Tonight, host John Oliver stated that Jones spends "nearly a quarter" of his on-air time promoting products sold on his website, many of which are purported solutions to medical and economic problems claimed to be caused by the conspiracy theories described on his show.

Research commissioned in 2017 by the Center for Environmental Health (CEH) determined that two products sold by Jones contained potentially dangerous levels of the heavy metal lead.

Jones continued his promotion of supplements during the COVID-19 pandemic. On March 12, 2020, Jones was issued a cease and desist from the Attorney General of New York, after he claimed, in the absence of any evidence, that products he sold, including colloidal silver toothpaste, were an effective treatment for COVID-19. The Food and Drug Administration (FDA) also sent him a letter on April 9, 2020, warning that the federal government might proceed to seize the products he was marketing for COVID-19 or fine him if he continued to sell them. A disclaimer then appeared on Jones's website, stating his products were not intended for treating "the novel coronavirus". On a linked page, Jones was quoted: "They plan on, if they've fluoridated you and vaccinated you and stunned you and mesmerized you with the TV and put you in a trance, on killing you". Jones continued to sell the products.

According to leaked text messages from Jones's mobile phone, InfoWars sold VasoBeet, a product it described as a "powerful beet formula", at a 900% retail markup as of September 2019. On January 29, 2020, InfoWars pulled in $245,000 in food sales, a day after Jones stoked fear about food shortages caused by the COVID-19 pandemic in a broadcast.

During the April 2022 InfoWars bankruptcy hearing, Jones's representative stated, "InfoWars is a prominent trademark in the conspiracy theory community and Alex Jones is equally as prominent". He added that Jones's name was the "Coca-Cola of the conspiracy theory community".

In 2023, Jones launched a new subscription-based podcast, Alex Jones Live. It was put on hold shortly after it began due to matters relating to his Sandy Hook case.

=== Social media restrictions and bans ===
In February 2018, YouTube issued a "strike" against the InfoWars channel after a video was posted in which Alex Jones accused David Hogg, a survivor of the Parkland school shooting, of being a paid "crisis actor". YouTube removed the video for violating its policies against harassment and bullying.

On July 24, 2018, YouTube removed four InfoWars' videos citing "child endangerment and hate speech", issued another "strike" against the channel, and suspended the ability to live stream. On July 27, 2018, Facebook suspended Jones's profile for 30 days, and removed the same videos, saying they violated the website's standards against hate speech and bullying. On August 3, 2018, Stitcher Radio removed all of his podcasts, citing harassment.

Later that year, on August 6, 2018, Facebook, Apple, YouTube and Spotify removed all content by Jones and InfoWars for policy violations. YouTube removed channels associated with InfoWars, including The Alex Jones Channel, stating that InfoWars had repeatedly attempted to post content similar to that which had already been removed, as well as attempting to circumvent the suspension of its live streaming privileges by having other users live stream on its behalf. On Facebook, four pages associated with InfoWars and Alex Jones were removed over repeated policy violations. Apple removed all podcasts associated with Jones from iTunes. Facebook cited instances of dehumanizing immigrants, Muslims and transgender people, as well as glorification of violence, as examples of hate speech. After InfoWars was banned from Facebook, Jones used another of his websites, NewsWars, to circumvent the ban.

On August 13, 2018, Vimeo removed all of Jones's videos because of "prohibitions on discriminatory and hateful content".

Jones's accounts were also removed from Pinterest, Mailchimp and LinkedIn. As of early August 2018, Jones retained active accounts on Instagram, Google+ and Twitter. Jones tweeted a Periscope video calling on others to get their "battle rifles" ready against antifa, the mainstream media, and Chicom operatives. In the video, he says: "Now is time to act on the enemy before they do a false flag". Twitter cited this as the reason to suspend his account for a week in August 2018.

In September, Jones was permanently banned from Twitter and Periscope after comments about CNN reporter Oliver Darcy. On September 7, 2018, the InfoWars app was removed from the Apple App Store for "objectionable content". He was banned from using PayPal for business transactions, having violated the company's policies by expressing "hate or discriminatory intolerance against certain communities and religions". After Elon Musk's purchase of Twitter, several previously banned accounts were reinstated including Donald Trump, Andrew Tate and Ye, but Jones was not among them. In November 2022, Musk referred to Jones as a person who "would use the deaths of children for gain, politics or fame" and said Jones would not be unbanned. He changed his position on December 10, 2023, when he reinstated Jones's account citing that if Jones said something false, Community Notes would correct him.

InfoWars remained available on Roku devices, in January 2019, a year after the channel's removal from multiple streaming services. Roku indicated that they do not "curate or censor based on viewpoint", and that it had policies against content that is "unlawful, incited illegal activities, or violates third-party rights", but that InfoWars was not in violation of these policies. Following a social media backlash, Roku removed InfoWars and stated, "After the InfoWars channel became available, we heard from concerned parties and have determined that the channel should be removed from our platform".

In March 2019, YouTube terminated the Resistance News channel due to its reuploading of live streams from InfoWars. On May 1, 2019, Jones was barred from using both Facebook and Instagram. Jones briefly moved to Dlive, but was suspended in April 2019 for violating community guidelines.

In March 2020, the InfoWars app was removed from the Google Play store due to Jones disseminating COVID-19 misinformation. A Google spokesperson stated that "combating misinformation on the Play Store is a top priority for the team" and apps that violate Play policy by "distributing misleading or harmful information" are removed from the store.

Comedian Joe Rogan attracted controversy for hosting Jones on his podcast, The Joe Rogan Experience, in October 2020. The episode was made available on YouTube and Spotify in spite of Jones's ban from both platforms. Though Rogan occasionally fact-checked Jones throughout the course of the interview, he nonetheless faced backlash from critics for giving Jones a platform to spread misinformation and validate his views. A YouTube spokesman responded that YouTube reviewed the episode and determined it did not violate the site's guidelines, noting that YouTube bans channels rather than individuals.

In March 2023, the Southern Poverty Law Center reported on Jones's leaked texts from his Sandy Hook defamation trial. The texts revealed that Jones and his collaborators had been trying to evade social media bans of InfoWars content by setting up alternate websites such as National File to disguise its origin.

In May 2023, Jones guest hosted Steven Crowder's podcast Louder with Crowder. Crowder's channel was subsequently suspended by YouTube for facilitating ban evasion by Jones.

In September 2025, after YouTube's parent company and Jim Jordan announced that all channels previously suspended for any form of political content violation would have the opportunity to be reinstated, Jones created a new channel on YouTube. Jones' new channel was suspended hours after creation. YouTube later stated that they had not started their program to reinstate users at that time.

=== Shutdown, liquidation and sale ===
On June 23, 2024, Christopher Murray, Jones's bankruptcy trustee, filed an emergency motion in a Houston court where he indicated his intent to not only sell InfoWars, but also shut down the website and liquidate its assets. In the motion, Murray stated that he made plans to "conduct an orderly wind-down" of the operations of InfoWars's parent company and also "liquidate its inventory".

Global Tetrahedron, the parent company of satirical news site The Onion, bid for the assets of InfoWars' parent company along with several families of victims of the Sandy Hook shooting, but the sale was halted for review on November 14. Days later, attorneys for Jones sued in the U.S Bankruptcy Court in Houston, alleging the bid was unlawful. Following a two-day court hearing in December, U.S. Bankruptcy Judge Christopher Lopez rejected the sale.

On August 13, 2025, Texas Judge Maya Guerra Gamble ordered Infowars assets to be turned over to a state receiver to be sold to pay the families. With The Onion reportedly renewing its efforts in Texas state court to acquire InfoWars, Jones asked the court on October 9 to halt proceedings.

On October 14, 2025, the U.S. Supreme Court rejected an appeal from Jones, leaving the $1.4 billion judgment in place. This appeal was separate from his appeal in Texas of a $49 million defamation judgment also related to a Sandy Hook victim.

== Views and incidents ==
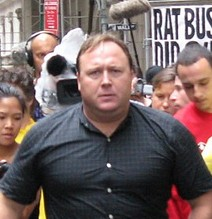
Jones during a 9/11 truth movement event on September 11, 2007, in Manhattan

Jones has described himself as a conservative, paleoconservative, and libertarian, terms he uses interchangeably. Others describe him as right-wing, alt-right, far-right, and populist. Asked about such labels, Jones said he is "proud to be listed as a thought criminal against Big Brother".

=== Early political activities ===
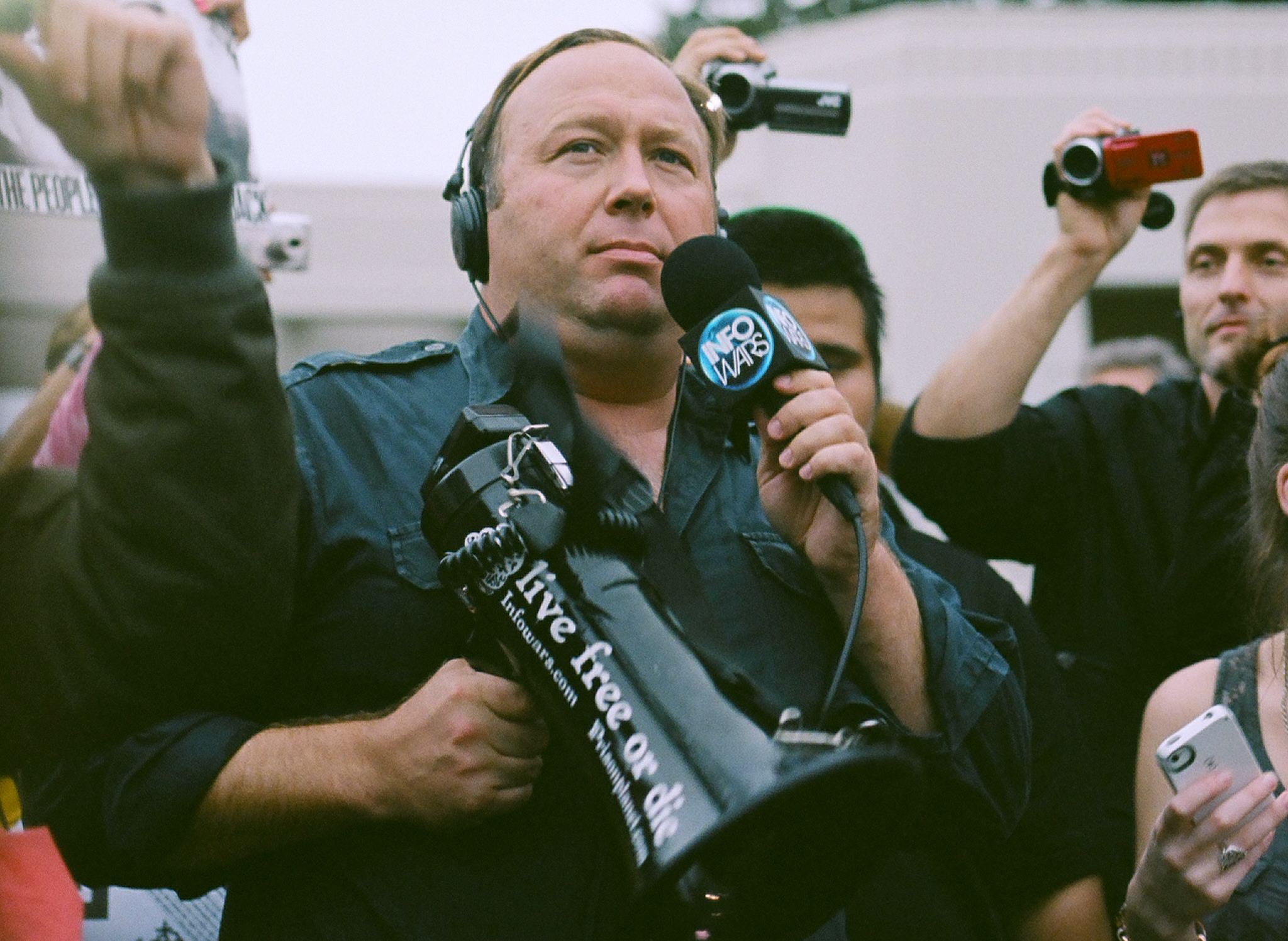
Jones at a protest in Dallas in 2013

In 1998, he was removed from a George W. Bush rally at Bayport Industrial District, Texas. Jones interrupted Governor Bush's speech, demanding that the Federal Reserve and Council on Foreign Relations be abolished. Journalist David Weigel, reporting on the incident, said Jones "seemed to launch into public events as if flung from another universe".

In April 1999, in the aftermath of the Columbine High School massacre in Colorado, Jones said that the U.S. government had "perpetrated" the shootings and that gunmen Eric Harris and Dylan Klebold, as well as the murders, were "100 percent false flag."

In early 2000, Jones was one of seven Republican candidates for state representative in Texas House District 48, an open swing district based in Austin, Texas. Jones said that he was running "to be a watchdog on the inside" but withdrew from the race after a couple of weeks.

On July 15, 2000, Jones infiltrated the Bohemian Grove Cremation of Care, a Jones-alleged planning event of the New World Order involving child sacrifice, which he called "a ritualistic shedding of conscience and empathy" and an "abuse of power".

On June 8, 2006, while on his way to cover a meeting of the Bilderberg Group in Ottawa, Jones was stopped and detained at the Ottawa airport by Canadian authorities. They confiscated his passport, camera equipment, and most of his belongings. He was later allowed to enter Canada legally. Jones said about his immigration hold: "I want to say, on the record, it takes two to tango. I could have handled it better".

On September 8, 2007, Jones was arrested while protesting at 6th Avenue and 48th Street in New York City, when his group crashed a live television show featuring Geraldo Rivera. He was charged with operating a megaphone without a permit, and two other persons were also cited for disorderly conduct.

=== Gun rights ===
Jones is a vocal gun rights advocate. MTV labeled him a "staunch Second Amendment supporter", while The Daily Telegraph in London called him a "gun-nut".

In January 2013, Jones was invited to speak on Piers Morgan's CNN show after Jones promoted an online petition to deport Morgan for supporting gun control. In the ensuing debate with Morgan, Jones stated that "1776 will commence again if you try to take our firearms". Jones was referring to the American Revolutionary War in relation to theoretical gun control measures taken by the government. Jones said he owned around 50 firearms. Morgan said on CNN's Newsroom the following evening he couldn't conceive of a "better advertisement for gun control than Alex Jones' interview last night". On his own show, according to The Atlantic, Glenn Beck said Morgan "is trying to make everybody who has guns and who believes in the Second Amendment to be a deterrent to an out of control government look like a madman. So now he immediately books the madman and makes him look like a conservative".

In a New York magazine interview in November 2013, Jones said mass shootings in the United States "were very, very suspicious, but at minimum, the tragic events were used to try to create guilt on the part of the average gun owner. So via the guilt trip, they would accept their individual liberties curtailed".

During an episode of his show InfoWars on May 24, 2022, Jones said concerning the Robb Elementary School shooting: "I would predict a lot of mass shootings right before elections and like clockwork, it is happening. To me, it is just very opportunistic what is happening".

=== Other opinions ===
Jones is a proponent of the New World Order conspiracy theory. In 2009, Jones claimed that a convicted con man's scheme to take over a long-vacant, would-be for-profit prison in Hardin, Montana, was part of a Federal Emergency Management Agency (FEMA) plot to detain US citizens in concentration camps, relating to said conspiracy theory. In 2010, Jones produced and directed Police State 4: The Rise of FEMA, a film he claimed "conclusively proves the existence of a secret network of FEMA camps" and that "The military-industrial complex is transforming our once free nation into a giant prison camp". In 2012, Jones linked to a story titled "List of All FEMA Concentration Camps in America Revealed" from the German UFO conspiracy website Disclose.tv.

On June 9, 2013, Jones appeared as a guest on the BBC's Sunday Politics, discussing conspiracy theories about the Bilderberg Group, with presenter Andrew Neil and journalist David Aaronovitch. Aaronovitch implied that, since Jones had not been killed for exposing conspiracies, they either do not exist or that Jones is a part of them himself. Jones began shouting and interrupting, and Neil ended the interview, describing Jones as "an idiot" and "the worst person I've ever interviewed". According to Neil on Twitter, Jones was still shouting until he knew that he was off-air.

Jones was in a "media crossfire" in 2011, which included criticism by Rush Limbaugh, when the news spread that Jared Lee Loughner, the perpetrator of the 2011 Tucson shooting, had been "a fan" of the 9/11 conspiracy film Loose Change of which Jones had been an executive producer.

Media Matters covered his claim that NFL players protesting during the national anthem were "kneeling to white genocide" and violence against whites, which the SPLC featured in their headlines review. His reporting and public views on the topic have received support and coverage from white nationalist publications and groups, such as the AltRight Corporation and the New Zealand National Front.

The Jones film Endgame: Blueprint for Global Enslavement features the Georgia Guidestones, a 19-foot-high megalithic granite monument installed in Elberton in 1982, an attraction that drew 20,000 annual visitors. On July 7, 2022, the day they were dynamited by unknown saboteurs, his guest U.S. Representative Marjorie Taylor Greene said ecumenical texts inscribed on it represented a nefarious future of "population control" as envisioned by the "hard left". She added, "There is a war of good and evil going on, and people are done with globalism". Jones admitted to enjoying the destruction, "at an animal level", though he added he would also have liked them to remain as an "evil edifice" exposing supposed depopulation plans.

Jones has repeatedly made hateful comments towards the LGBT community and has associated the community with pedophilia. In 2010, he claimed: "The reason there's so many gay people now is because it's a chemical warfare operation, and I have the government documents where they said they're going to encourage homosexuality with chemicals so that people don't have children". In a 2013 interview on YouTube concerning same-sex marriage, he ultimately blamed the "globalists" who "want to encourage the breakdown of the family, because the family is where people owe their allegiance" as a means "to get rid of God" by "taking the rights of an ancient, unified program of marriage and ... are breaking it". He has claimed that the government is putting chemicals in water supplies to make people gay. (Note: He has described tap water as a "gay bomb" and claimed that chemicals put in water by the government have made frogs homosexual and, without evidence, that the majority of frogs in the United States are "gay" (see: LGBT chemicals conspiracy theory). He has stated, "I don't like 'em putting chemicals in the water that turn the freakin' frogs gay!" His rant has inspired an internet meme.) In 2018, Jones threatened to come after drag performers with torches "like the villagers in the night".

Jones believes that global warming is a hoax made up by the World Bank to control the world economy through a carbon tax.

Salon paraphrased Jones as having claimed President Obama had "access to weather weapons capable of not only creating tornadoes but also moving them around, on demand". His belief in weather warfare has been reported by mainstream media. He has claimed that Hurricane Irma may have been geo-engineered.

Jones is a proponent of the conspiracy theory that Michelle Obama is transgender, with much of his apparent proof being pictures of Obama where it appears she has a bulge in her pants, and a video clip where Barack Obama refers to somebody as "Michael". Jones has claimed that the election of Joe Biden is part of a plot by the deep state and the globalists to bring about "the takedown of America".

In April 2017, Jones was criticized for claiming that the Khan Shaykhun chemical attack was a hoax and false flag. Jones stated that the attack was potentially carried out by civil defense group White Helmets, which he claimed are an Al-Qaeda-affiliated terrorist front financed by George Soros.

While Jones initially supported QAnon, Right Wing Watch reported that he had ceased to support QAnon by May 2018, declaring the source "completely compromised". In 2021, after the Capitol attack, Jones denounced believers of the QAnon conspiracy theory on InfoWars.

Jones is known for both his opposition to vaccines, and his views on vaccine controversies. On June 16, 2017, Vox covered his claim that the introduction of the Sesame Street character Julia, an autistic Muppet, was "designed to normalize autism, a disorder caused by vaccines". On November 20, 2017, The New Yorker quoted Jones as claiming InfoWars was "defending people's right to not be forcibly infected with vaccines". Critics argue that he endangers children "by convincing their parents that vaccines are dangerous". Jones has specifically disputed the safety and effectiveness of MMR vaccines.

In April 2022, Jones denied Russian war crimes by accusing the Ukrainians of staging the Bucha massacre.

In August 2024, Jones suggested he might relocate to Russia after Vladimir Putin signed a decree offering sanctuary to those who shared "traditional values."

== Connections to Donald Trump ==
=== 2016 presidential campaign ===
On December 2, 2015, Donald Trump, then a presidential candidate, appeared on The Alex Jones Show, with Trump stating to Jones at the end: "your reputation is amazing. I will not let you down. You'll be very, very impressed, I hope." During the broadcast, Jones compared Trump to George Washington and said 90% of his listeners supported his candidacy. Jones and Trump both said the appearance was arranged by Roger Stone, who made multiple appearances on Jones's program during the 2016 presidential campaign. Ron and Rand Paul were the only other significant politicians to appear on Jones's show in the preceding few years. Jones indicated his support for Trump during the presidential campaign.

During his 2016 presidential campaign, via his Twitter account, Trump linked to InfoWars articles as sources for his claim "thousands and thousands" of Muslims celebrated 9/11 and the false assertion California was not suffering from a drought. A few days before one of Trump's August 2016 rallies, InfoWars published a video claiming Democratic candidate Hillary Clinton had mental health issues, which Trump recycled in his campaign speech at the rally, according to Mother Jones. Trump's claim the 2016 vote would be rigged, The Independent reported, followed a Jones video making the same claim two days earlier. In one of her own speeches and video ads, Clinton criticized Trump for his ties to Jones.

Jones ran a campaign attacking former president Bill Clinton as a rapist. He designed a T-shirt, ran another "get on MSM" competition and gate-crashed The Young Turks set at the RNC, while displaying the T-shirt, resulting in a physical altercation with Cenk Uygur. Jones said Hillary Clinton and Barack Obama were demons because they both smelt of sulfur, a claim supposedly based on assertions from people in contact with them. In late 2015, InfoWars began selling T-shirts with the slogan "Hillary for Prison".

According to Jones, Trump called him on the day after the election to thank him for his help in the campaign.

=== Trump as president ===
In April 2018, Jones publicly criticized Trump during a livestream, after Trump announced a military strike against Syria. During the stream, Jones also stated that Trump had not called him during the prior six months. A leaked interview of Jones in January 2019 expressing displeasure over his relationship with Trump was released by the Southern Poverty Law Center in March 2021, with Jones stating "I wish I never would have fucking met Trump ... I'm so sick of fucking Donald Trump, man. God, I'm fucking sick of him".

Jones supported Trump during his re-election campaign in 2020 and called on demonstrations to be held on the false premise the election had been "rigged" against Trump.

After Trump recommended at an August 2021 rally that people choose to be vaccinated against COVID-19, Jones said that Trump was either lying or "not that bright" and "a dumbass".

Numerous then-serving and former Trump advisers have appeared on Jones's show, including Counselor to the President Steve Bannon, Senior Advisor to the President Stephen Miller, National Security Advisor Michael Flynn, and senior Trump campaign advisers Jason Miller and Roger Stone.

=== Events related to the January 6 Capitol attack ===
Jones partially funded and raised other funds to finance the January 6 Trump rally in Washington, D.C., that preceded the 2021 United States Capitol attack. The New York Times reported he assisted in raising at least $650,000 from Julie Fancelli, a Publix grocery chain heiress who is a follower of InfoWars, to finance Trump's rally on the Ellipse, including $200,000 of the total amount deposited in one of Jones's bank accounts.

Jones attended the January 5 and 6 rallies at the Capitol. On January 5, he was a scheduled speaker at the March to Save America and said, "We have only begun to resist the globalists. We have only begun our fight against their tyranny. They have tried to steal this election in front of everyone." Jones also stated that "I don't know how this is all going to end, but if they want to fight, they better believe they've got one", according to the same video. Jones called Joe Biden a "slave of Satan" and said, "Whatever happens to President Trump in 15 days, he is still the elected president of this republic. And we do not recognize the Communist Chinese agent Joe Biden, or his controllers."

The next day, Wednesday, January 6, at a gathering in Lafayette Park north of the Capitol, he addressed the crowd with a bullhorn, and stated that he had seen "over a hundred" members of antifa in the crowd, a baseless assertion other Trump supporters had also made, although the FBI said there was no evidence of antifa involvement. The same day, a video of Jones was posted on InfoWars, in which he is recorded saying "We declare 1776 against the new world order ... We need to understand we're under attack, and we need to understand this is 21st-century warfare and get on a war-footing." In the same video, before setting off toward the Capitol building, Jones told the crowd: "We're here to take our rightful country back peacefully, because we're not globalist, antifa criminals. So let's start marching, and I salute you all." When rioters attacked the Capitol, Jones called on them to stop. "Let's not fight the police and give the system what they want", he said.

In February 2021, The Washington Post reported that the FBI was investigating any role Jones might have played in influencing the participation of Proud Boys and Oath Keepers in the incursion. Jones had previously hosted leaders of the two groups on his programs. Some members of the groups had been indicted for conspiracy in the incident.

On November 22, 2021, the House Select Committee on the January 6 Attack subpoenaed Jones for testimony and documents by December 18 and 6, respectively. He had a virtual meeting with the committee by video link on January 24, 2022. By the estimate of his legal team, Jones said, he pleaded the Fifth Amendment 100 times and had been instructed to do so by his counsel.

On August 5, 2022, during a defamation trial in Texas brought by Sandy Hook school shooting parents against Jones, a lawyer for the plaintiffs revealed that Jones's lawyer had inadvertently sent him two years of texts from Jones's phone. On August 8, the House select committee investigating the January 6 attack received those text messages; they had requested the information since Jones had helped organize a rally before the Capitol attack. Jones's lawyer, Norm Pattis, had also released confidential discovery items including Sandy Hook plaintiffs' medical records, and consequently, in January 2023, a judge suspended his law license. At the time of his license suspension, Pattis was part of the legal team defending Proud Boys leader Joseph Biggs against charges of seditious conspiracy.

On September 12, 2023, Owen Shroyer, an InfoWars co-host who accompanied Jones to the capital on January 6, 2021, was sentenced to thirty days in prison for violating an active order to stay away from the Capitol grounds. He had received the order after previously being arrested for causing a disturbance in another governmental building.

=== 2026 Iran war ===
In April 2026, amid the 2026 Iran war, Trump threatened Iran by writing on social media: "A whole civilization will die tonight, never to be brought back again". Jones, alongside several other notable conservatives, called for Trump to be removed from office through the use of the Twenty-fifth Amendment.

== Litigation ==
=== Pizzagate conspiracy theory ===
In February 2017, James Alefantis, owner of Comet Ping Pong pizzeria, sent Jones a letter demanding an apology and retraction of his advocacy for the Pizzagate conspiracy theory. Jones was given one month to comply or be subject to a libel suit. In March 2017, Jones apologized to Alefantis and retracted his allegations.

=== Chobani yogurt company ===
In April 2017, the Chobani yogurt company sued Jones over his allegations that their Idaho plant was involved in several tuberculosis cases, and a sexual assault taking place the year prior. As a result, Jones issued an apology and retraction of his allegations in May 2017. However, while being deposed in the Texas defamation lawsuit filed by Sandy Hook parents, Jones reiterated many of his previous allegations against Chobani and its founder, Hamdi Ulukaya, indicating that he continues to espouse the false claims.

=== Charlottesville car attack ===
In March 2018, Brennan Gilmore, who shared a video he captured of a car hitting counter-protesters at the 2017 Unite the Right rally, filed a lawsuit against Jones and six others. According to the lawsuit, Jones said that Gilmore was acting as part of a false flag operation conducted by disgruntled government "deep state" employees promoting a coup against Trump. Gilmore alleged he received death threats from Jones's audience. In March 2022, Gilmore secured an admission of liability from Jones.

=== Sandy Hook Elementary School shooting ===
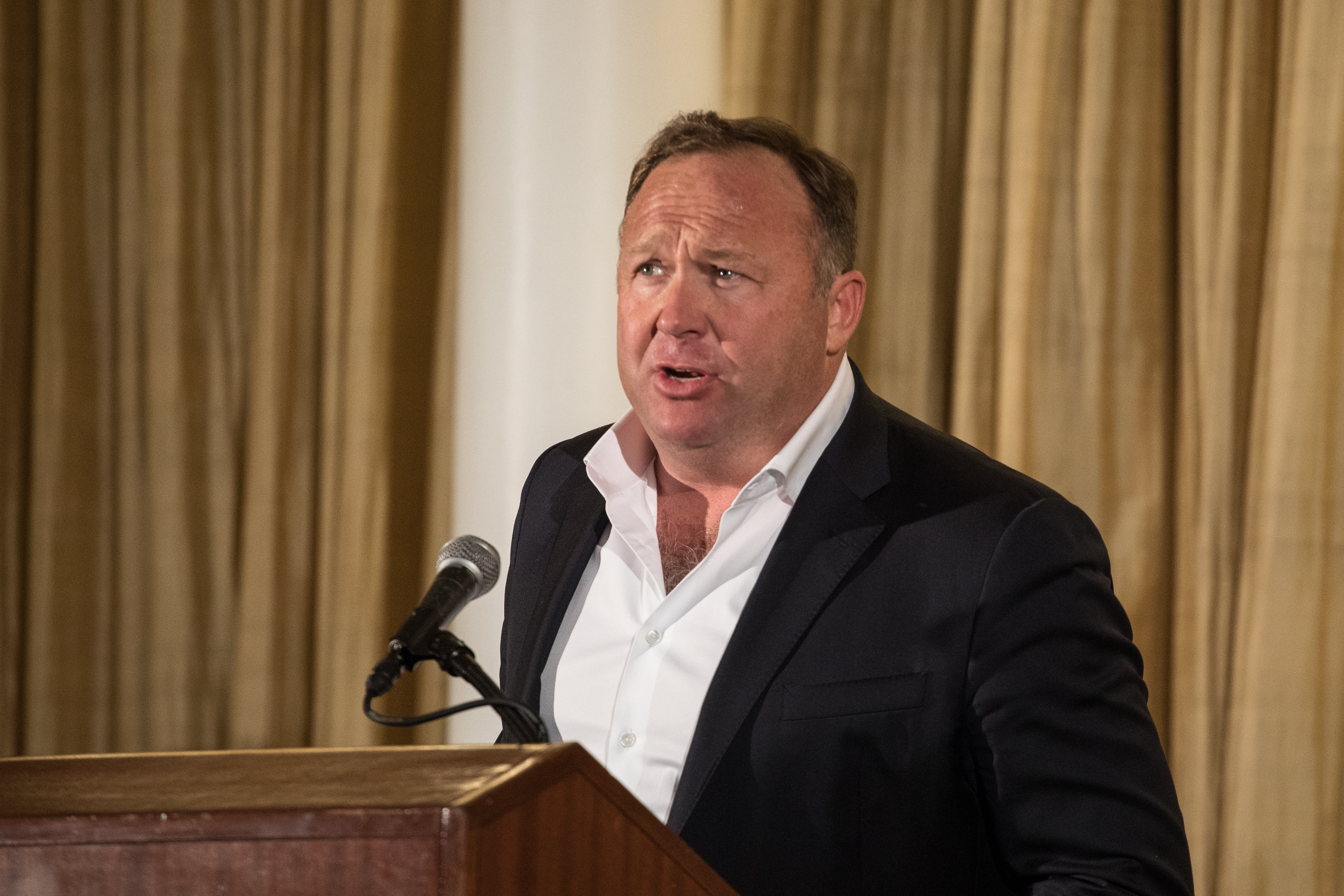
Jones speaking in Washington, D.C. in 2018

Jones has repeatedly spread disproven conspiracy theories about the 2012 Sandy Hook Elementary School shooting, including claiming that it was a "false flag" operation perpetrated by gun control advocates, that "no one died" in Sandy Hook, and that the incident was "staged", "synthetic", "manufactured", "a giant hoax" and "completely fake with actors". Jones faced numerous defamation lawsuits due to these lies.

==== Pozner and De La Rosa vs. Jones ====
On April 16, 2018 Leonard Pozner and Veronique De La Rosa, parents of victim Noah Pozner, filed a defamation suit against Jones, Infowars and Free Speech Systems in Travis County, Texas. Pozner, who has been forced to move several times to avoid harassment and death threats, was accused by Jones of being a crisis actor.

==== Heslin vs. Jones ====
On April 16, 2018, Neil Heslin and Scarlett Lewis, parents of victim Jesse Lewis, filed a defamation suit against Jones, Infowars and Free Speech Systems in Travis County, Texas.

Jones was found to be in contempt of court even before the trial started as a result of his failure to produce witnesses and materials relevant to the procedures. Consequently, Jones and Infowars were fined a total of $126,000 in October and December 2019.

On January 22, 2021, the Texas Supreme Court threw out an appeal for dismissal by Jones of four defamation lawsuits from families of Sandy Hook victims. The court allowed the judgments of two lower courts to stand without comment, allowing the lawsuits to continue.

On September 27, 2021, a district judge in Texas issued three default judgments against Jones, requiring him to pay all damages in two lawsuits. These rulings came after Jones repeatedly failed to hand over documents and evidence as ordered by the court, which the judge characterized as "flagrant bad faith and callous disregard for the responsibilities of discovery under the rules".

The jury trial began in Texas on July 25, 2022, where the plaintiffs' attorney said they would seek $150 million from the jury. Heslin testified on August 2 that conspiracy theorists, fueled by Jones's statements, fired into his house and car and subjected him and his family to harassment. He said Jones's failure to attend court during his testimony was a "cowardly act". While Heslin was testifying, Jones was broadcasting his show, calling Heslin "slow" and "manipulated by some very bad people". Jones subsequently arrived at court to present his testimony, first sitting through that of Jesse's mother Scarlett Lewis. Lewis said, "Alex, I want you to hear this. We're more polarized than ever as a country. Some of that is because of you." She asked Jones: "Do you think I'm an actor?" Jones responded, "No, I don't think you're an actor." As the only person testifying in his defense, Jones admitted the Sandy Hook shooting was "100% real", and agreed with his own attorney that it was "absolutely irresponsible" to push falsehoods about the shooting and its victims.

Jones testified that he had complied with court orders in defamation suits and is bankrupt. On August 3, cross-examination revealed that Jones had not fully complied with court orders to provide text messages and emails for pretrial evidence gathering. Judge Maya Guerra Gamble of Travis County District Court admonished him for lying under oath, as his failure to comply with court orders was the reason he lost the defamation suits, and that bankruptcy proceedings had yet to be adjudicated. Gamble said, "You're under oath. That means things must actually be true when you say them". After the judge left the courtroom, Jones said Lewis and Heslin were being "controlled". While the jury deliberated the amount of compensatory damages, Jones was claiming on his radio show that the proceedings were "an incredible spectacle" backed by globalists trying to shut him down. On August 4, 2022, the jury ordered Jones pay Heslin and Lewis $4.1 million in compensatory damages, and the following day, he was ordered to pay an additional $45.2 million in punitive damages. On November 22, 2022, a judge ruled that Jones must pay the full amount of the punitive damages, even though this amount exceeds a cap under Texas law. (Jones's attorneys had estimated the punitive damages award would be reduced to $1.5 million, while the plaintiffs' attorneys had expected it to be reduced to $4.5 million.)

On November 22, 2022, Judge Gamble ruled that the punitive damages cap did not apply in this case due to the rare and egregious nature of the harm. She also questioned the constitutionality of the damages cap in general.

On April 25, 2023, Judge Gamble ordered Jones's attorney, Andino Reynal, to pay $97,169 to Heslin and Lewis for his bad-faith attempts to delay the trial, with a contingency fee of $55,000 should Reynal appeal and lose, and $61,600 if he appeals to the Texas Supreme Court and loses.

==== Lafferty et al. vs. Jones ====
On June 26, 2018, seven families of victims and an FBI agent who responded to the attack filed a defamation lawsuit in Connecticut Superior Court against Jones, Infowars, Free Speech Systems, Infowars Health and others for spreading false claims, resulting in the harassment, stalking and threatening of the plaintiffs. One of their attorneys was Josh Koskoff.

By February 2019, the plaintiffs won a series of court rulings requiring Jones to testify under oath. Jones was later ordered to undergo a sworn deposition, along with three other defendants related to the operation of Infowars. He was also ordered to turn over internal business documents related to Infowars. In this deposition in the last week of March 2019, Jones acknowledged the deaths were real, stating he had "almost like a form of psychosis", where he "basically thought everything was staged".

On March 25, 2019, Jeremy Richman, one of the plaintiffs, whose daughter Avielle was killed, committed suicide. Jones, through his lawyer, offered condolences to Richman's family, but later that day on his show suggested that Richman had been murdered and that his death had something to do with special counsel Robert Mueller's investigation into Russian election interference.

On April 5, 2021, the Supreme Court of the United States declined to hear an appeal by Jones against a court sanction in the lawsuit.

On November 15, 2021, the judge found Jones liable by default for defamation, for "willful non-compliance" in failing to turn over documents to the families in line with court orders.

On March 29, 2022, Jones offered a settlement of $120,000 to each of the thirteen people involved in the lawsuits, which was quickly rejected.

On June 2, 2022, Jones's attorneys asked the judge to drop them from the case. The judge said she had heard this before, citing thirteen times in the past four years when Jones's attorneys asked to replace each other or be dropped from the case. She ordered them to continue to represent Jones until she ruled on the motion on June 15.

On October 12, 2022, the jury awarded $965 million to be shared by 15 plaintiffs (eight families and one first responder). The plaintiffs' individual awards ranged from $28.8 million to $120 million. During the trial, the families testified that they had been threatened and harassed over years due to Jones's falsehoods. Jones reacted live to the verdict on his show, mocking it: "Do these people actually think they're getting any money?" He implored his viewers to donate to him to "appeal", and also declared that the jury's verdict was an attempt to "scare us away from questioning" school shootings such as the Stoneman Douglas High School shooting and the Robb Elementary School shooting, but "we're not going to stop".

On November 10, 2022, the judge awarded the plaintiffs a further $473 million in punitive damages in the form of lawyers' fees, bringing the total to over $1.4 billion. The judge also issued an order that Jones was "not to transfer, encumber, dispose or move his assets out of the United States until further order of the court".

Jones moved for a new trial, but on December 22, 2022, the judge denied his request.

By the end of the summer of 2023, Jones had paid nothing to the families.

On December 6, 2024, the Connecticut Appellate Court reduced the total Jones owed to about $1.2 billion. It did this by affirming the jury's $965 million verdict while saying that Jones would not have to pay the $150 million in punitive damages that the lower court had awarded the plaintiffs. Jones sought to appeal to the state's Supreme Court, but on April 8, 2025, it declined to hear his appeal.

==== Sherlach vs. Jones ====
On July 24, 2018, William Sherlach, husband of victim and school psychologist Mary Sherlach, filed a defamation lawsuit in Connecticut Superior Court against Jones, Infowars, Free Speech Systems and Infowars Health. Sherlach's lawsuit was consolidated into the Lafferty et al. vs. Jones lawsuit for the Connecticut trial.

==== Attempts to protect assets ====
Numerous media sources have raised questions on how much Jones really owns and hides in assets.

On April 6, 2022, according to the Associated Press and The Daily Beast, a lawsuit was filed in Austin, Texas, by some of the Sandy Hook families accusing Jones of hiding assets worth millions of dollars after he began being sued for defamation by the families of Sandy Hook victims. The suit claims Jones "conspired to divert his assets to shell companies owned by insiders like his parents, his children, and himself". The lawsuit alleges Jones drew $18 million from the Infowars company beginning in 2018 and accuses Jones of claiming a "dubious" $54 million debt at about the same time to another company alleged by the lawsuit to be also owned by Jones. Norm Pattis, an attorney for Jones, said the lawsuit was "ridiculous" and denied that there had been any attempt to conceal assets.

==== Bankruptcies ====
On April 17, 2022, three companies owned by Jones filed for Chapter 11 bankruptcy protection in the U.S. Bankruptcy Court for the Southern District of Texas, suspending further civil litigation claims, as the families had sued Jones as well as his companies. The three companies affected were InfoW, Prison Planet TV, and IWHealth (or Infowars Health). The court filings estimated InfoWars' assets at between $0–$50,000, but its liabilities (including from the damages awarded against Jones in defamation suits) were stated as being between $1 million and $10 million. Regarding why Jones did not personally file for bankruptcy, his representative stated, "It would ruin his name and harm his ability to sell merchandise" and "Putting him in bankruptcy would harm his trademark value in terms of cashflow". A lawyer for the families involved in a Connecticut lawsuit against Jones responded, "Alex Jones is just delaying the inevitable: a public trial in which he will be held accountable for his profit-driven campaign of lies against the Sandy Hook families who have brought this lawsuit."

On June 10, 2022, a federal judge in Texas dismissed the bankruptcy protection case after Jones and the families agreed that the three companies would be dropped from the defamation lawsuits against Jones, allowing them to continue in Texas and Connecticut. On July 29, 2022, the parent company of InfoWars, Free Speech Systems, LLC, filed for bankruptcy. In response to the Connecticut legal settlement made against him, Jones had previously claimed assets of $6.2 million in January 2022.

On December 2, 2022, Jones filed for Chapter 11 personal bankruptcy in the Southern District of Texas, claiming that his assets were between $1 million and $10 million, while his debts were between $1 billion and $10 billion. He also claimed that he had 50 to 99 creditors, and in February 2023, that the Department of Justice intended to seize his pet cat, valued at $2,000, to pay debts owed to the Sandy Hook families. On October 19, 2023, a Texas bankruptcy judge ruled that Jones cannot rely on bankruptcy protection to avoid paying the $1.5 billion he owes to the Sandy Hook families as a result of the Connecticut lawsuit. It remained unclear whether he would be able to reduce the amount of punitive damages in the Texas case.

In November 2023, the Sandy Hook families offered a settlement in which Jones would pay $85 million over 10 years (about 6 percent of what he had been court-ordered to pay). The offer was filed within Jones's personal bankruptcy case. The following month, Jones countered with an offer of $55 million over 10 years. In February 2024, Jones's general unsecured creditors (mostly Sandy Hook families) voted in favor of a Chapter 11 plan that would liquidate and redistribute his assets.

Appearing emotional and defiant, on June 1, 2024, Jones said on his program, "At the end of the day, we're going to beat these people. I'm not trying to be dramatic here, but it's been a hard fight. These people hate our children." The next day, the families filed an emergency motion in U.S. Bankruptcy Court in Houston, asking the judge to liquidate Alex Jones's company rather than allow him to reorganize it. The court filing said Jones has "failed to demonstrate any hope of beginning to satisfy" their claims. On June 6, Jones's attorneys filed a motion to convert his bankruptcy to Chapter 7 status, which would lead to liquidation of his personal assets, including his stake in InfoWars, which was agreed to by the plaintiffs the following day. On June 14, the judge approved the Chapter 7 liquidation. On June 24, the court-appointed trustee publicly revealed that he planned to shut down InfoWars. On September 24, the judge approved the sale of Free Speech Systems, the parent company of InfoWars.

The auction was scheduled for November 13, 2024. The next day, the trustee, Christopher Murray, announced that The Onion, through its parent company Global Tetrahedron, had won with a bid of $1.75 million in cash, paired with a pledge by some of the Sandy Hook families to give up part of their share of the proceeds so that other claimants would receive more. The runner-up, First United American Companies (a firm linked to Jones's online business), had bid $3.5 million in cash. Jones and the firm argued the process was rigged and accused the trustee of colluding with the winning side, which the trustee, the families and The Onion denied. On December 10, 2024, Judge Christopher Lopez declined to approve the sale. He found no bad faith, but said the trustee's switch to a single round of sealed final bids left potential money on the table because bidders did not know of competing offers.

On February 5, 2025, Lopez rejected a proposed deal between the Connecticut and Texas families that would have allowed a second auction, ruling that Free Speech Systems was no longer in bankruptcy, so claims against it could not be handled in his court. His decision suggested that a bankruptcy sale could cover only Jones's ownership stake in the company, not its assets. On August 13, 2025, a Travis County, Texas, state judge placed Free Speech Systems into receivership and appointed Gregory Milligan as receiver to liquidate its assets. Jones appealed, arguing that the company's assets belonged to his Chapter 7 estate, but later in 2025 Lopez ruled that the bankruptcy stay did not cover them. On October 14, 2025, the U.S. Supreme Court declined to hear Jones's appeal of the Connecticut judgment of nearly $1.5 billion.

On April 20, 2026, The Onion and the receiver proposed a license giving the outlet exclusive temporary use of the intellectual property of Free Speech Systems for six months, renewable for six more, at $81,000 per month. The plan, which the Sandy Hook families supported, would have turned Infowars' platforms into a parody site. On April 29, the Texas Third Court of Appeals, acting on an emergency motion from Jones's lawyers, temporarily blocked the turnover of Infowars assets to the receiver, which stalled the deal hours before a hearing to approve it. The families, the receiver and The Onion asked the Supreme Court of Texas to overturn the stay. Jones said the receiver had stopped paying the studio's rent and other bills, and he aired the final InfoWars broadcast from its Austin studio on April 30; by May 1 the website displayed only an "Off Air" message. Jones relaunched his show on a new site, AlexJonesLive.com.

On May 15, 2026, a federal judge dismissed Jones's appeal over whether the assets of Free Speech Systems were part of his bankruptcy estate, leaving the families free to pursue them through state-court collection. The Supreme Court of Texas later ordered Jones's attorneys to respond to the families' challenge to the stay on collection efforts by July 6. In July 2026, The Onion launched its own Infowars parody on its website without waiting for control of the original platform, while its takeover bid remained unresolved.

=== Stoneman Douglas High School shooting ===
Jones spread discredited conspiracy theories about the 2018 Parkland high school shooting. He stated survivor David Hogg was a crisis actor.

Marcel Fontaine sued Jones on April 2, 2018, after InfoWars falsely identified him as the gunman and posted photos of him in several versions of an article on the InfoWars website about the massacre. The lawsuit was filed in Texas court naming Jones, InfoWars, parent company Free Speech Systems, LLC and Infowars employee Kit Daniels as defendants. Fontaine's lawsuit was the first one against Jones that involved his defamatory statements about mass school shootings. One of his lawyers stated that "Marcel Fontaine is the only reason why we filed the first Sandy Hook case", because after Fontaine's suit was filed, the families of two boys slain in the Sandy Hook shooting contacted his law firm about also suing Jones. Fontaine died in an apartment building fire in Worcester, Massachusetts, on May 14, 2022, caused by a former tenant. The tenant was arrested and charged with his murder as well as the deaths of three others.

=== Colony Ridge ===
In May 2026, the owners of Colony Ridge, a large housing development in Liberty County, Texas, filed a defamation suit against Jones and Pete Chambers, who campaigned unsuccessfully to be the Republican candidate in the 2026 Texas gubernatorial election. The lawsuit seeks over $10 million in damages and centers on comments Jones and Chambers made during a February broadcast which allegedly "branded [Colony Ridge] a 'mortgage scam,' a 'giant fraud site,' and a 'Sanctuary City' controlled by Mexican drug cartels," according to court filings. The lawsuit says that Jones took down the comments from the social network X after they had been viewed over 650,000 times, but that the comments were still circulating elsewhere online, and that "At no point have [Jones nor Chambers] offered any correction, clarification, or retraction of their lies about Colony Ridge." The owners recently made a $68 million settlement with the Department of Justice over allegedly predatory loan practices, while other Republican figures in Texas had also described the development as a "hotbed of crime" with neighborhoods controlled by cartels, and federal agents had recently conducted a series of immigration raids there.

== Personal life ==
Jones has three children with his former wife Kelly Jones (née Nichols). The couple divorced in March 2015. In 2017, Kelly sought sole or joint custody of their children due to her ex-husband's behavior. She asserted that "he's not a stable person" and she was "concerned that he is engaged in felonious behavior, threatening a member of Congress [Adam Schiff]". His attorney responded by claiming that "he's playing a character" and describing him as a "performance artist". On his show, Jones denied playing a character and he called his show "the most bona fide, hard-core, real McCoy thing there is, and everybody knows it"; whereas in court, Jones clarified that he generally agreed with his attorney's statement, but that he disagreed with the media's interpretation of the term "performance artist". Kelly was awarded the right to decide where their children live while he maintains visitation rights. In April 2020, a state district judge denied an emergency motion by Kelly to secure custody of their daughters for the next two weeks after Jones led a rally at the Capitol, where he was mobbed by supporters and called COVID-19 a hoax. In 2023, after a 2009 audioclip of Jones berating his then wife was obtained by the Daily Mail, Kelly claimed that Jones was "a total racist" regarding her Jewish heritage, claiming that her genes were "flawed".

His son, Rex Jones, has worked for InfoWars. His father, David Jones, is involved in InfoWars's business, and previously handled human resources tasks for his son, according to his testimony in a deposition.

Jones married Erika Wulff in 2017; they have one child. In February 2023, the Southern Poverty Law Center (SPLC) reported on text messages that appeared to corroborate a September 2022 Rolling Stone story reporting that Jones may have spied on Wulff in 2019. In the texts reviewed by the SPLC, Jones told his security employee to monitor Wulff, expressing concern that she was cheating on him.

During Jones's 2017 custody trial, Alissa Sherry, the case manager for his family therapy sessions, testified that he had been diagnosed with narcissistic personality disorder.

== Media ==
=== Films ===
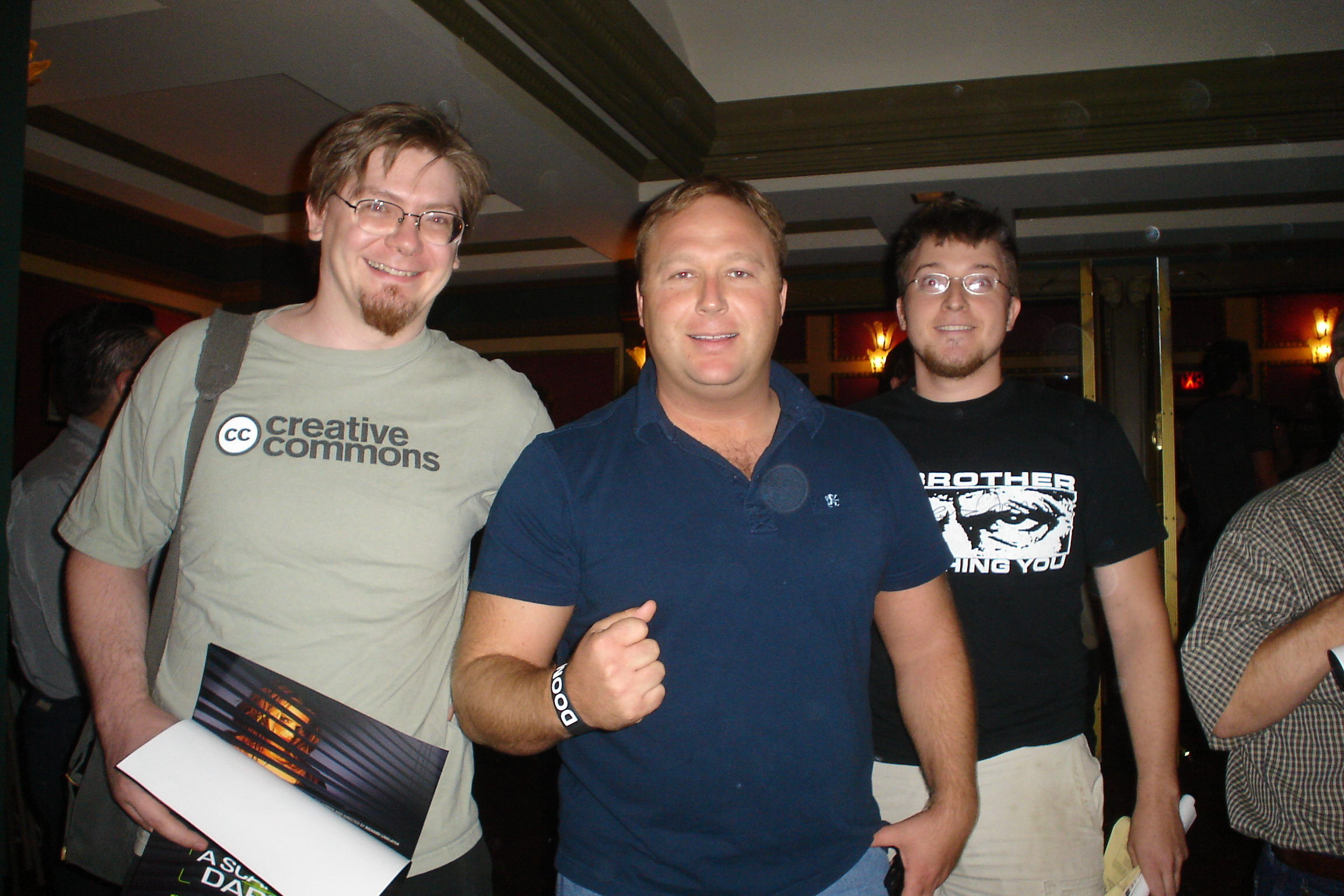
Jones and filmgoers at the première of A Scanner Darkly in which Jones has a cameo

Year	Title	Credited as				Role	Notes
Year	Title	Director	Writer	Producer	Actor	Role	Notes
2001	Waking Life	No	No	No	Yes	Man in Car with PA	Cameo
2002	911: The Road to Tyranny	Yes	Yes	Yes	Yes	Himself	Documentary
2006	A Scanner Darkly	No	No	No	Yes	Preacher	Minor role
2007	Endgame: Blueprint for Global Enslavement	Yes	Yes	Yes	Yes	Himself	Documentary
2007	Loose Change: Final Cut	No	No	Executive	No	—N/a	Documentary
2009	The Obama Deception: The Mask Comes Off	Yes	Yes	Yes	Yes	Himself	Documentary
2016	Amerigeddon	No	No	No	Yes	Senator Reed	Minor role
2026	A Super Progressive Movie	No	No	Yes	No	—N/a	

=== Television ===
Year	Title	Role	Notes
2009–2012	Conspiracy Theory with Jesse Ventura	Himself	Recurring guest

=== Author ===
- Jones, Alex (2002). 9-11: Descent Into Tyranny. Austin, Texas: Progressive Press. ISBN 978-1-57558-113-2. OCLC 52400701.
- Jones, Alex (2009). The Answer to 1984 Is 1776. London: The Disinformation Company. ISBN 978-1-934708-15-6. OCLC 421814975.
- Jones, Alex (2022), The Great Reset: And the War for the World, Skyhorse, ISBN 978-1-5107-7404-9, OCLC 1338676272
- Jones, Alex; Heckenlively, Kent (2023), The Great Awakening: Defeating the Globalists and Launching the Next Great Renaissance, Skyhorse, ISBN 978-1-5107-7902-0

=== Film subject ===
Year	Title	Notes
2001	Waking Life	by Richard Linklater
2001	The Secret Rulers of the World	by Jon Ronson, part four of a five part series
2003	Aftermath: Unanswered Questions from 9/11	by Stephen Marshall
2007–11	The Conspiracy Files	by BBC Two, two episodes
2009	New World Order (documentary)	by Luke Meyer and Andrew Neel
2010	The Fall of America and the Western World	by Brian Kraft
2022	Alex's War (documentary)	by Alex Lee Moyer
2024	The Truth vs. Alex Jones (documentary)	by Dan Reed

=== Video games ===
- Alex Jones: NWO Wars
