= Lost at Sea: The Jon Ronson Mysteries =

2012 book by Jon Ronson

- First edition (US)
- Author: Jon Ronson
- Language: English
- Genre: non-fiction
- Publisher: Picador (UK); Riverhead Books (USA)
- Publication date: 2012
- Publication place: United Kingdom
- ISBN: 978-1447222576
- Preceded by: The Psychopath Test (2011)

Lost at Sea: The Jon Ronson Mysteries is a 2012 book by Jon Ronson which highlights and further elaborates many of Ronson's magazine articles.

== Contents ==
The book is subdivided into six parts, each comprising four chapters, as follows:

- Part One: 'What does electricity taste like?' 'Like a planet around a star.' — The Things We're Willing To Believe
- Part Two: 'Have you ever stood next to an elephant, my friend?' — Rebellious Lives
- Part Three: 'Their eyes met and exchanged a flurry of masculine/feminine master/slave signals.' — High-Flying Lives
- Part Four: 'I've thought about doing myself in loads of times.' — Everyday Difficulty
- Part Five: 'I know it's bitter. Just keep drinking. Put your finger over your nose and chugalug it all down.' — Stepping Over the Line
- Part Six: 'The police stole my super suit.' — Justice

Each chapter represents an article written by Ronson about his adventures in interviewing eccentric personalities and meeting "extraordinary" people in stories of madness, strange behaviour and mysterious events on the fringe of normality in western society. These stories range from an investigative profile of an assisted suicide practitioner to coverage of a pop star’s paedophilia trial. The underlying thread is "Ronson’s desire to report on and attempt to explain human dysfunction in its various, colorful forms."
