= Them: Adventures with Extremists =

2001 book by Jon Ronson

- First edition
- Author: Jon Ronson
- Language: English
- Publisher: Picador
- Publication date: 2001
- Publication place: United Kingdom
- Media type: Print (Hardcover and Paperback)
- Pages: 337 (first edition, hardback)
- ISBN: 978-0-330-37545-0
- OCLC: 441327388

Them: Adventures with Extremists is a book by British journalist Jon Ronson published in 2001. It accompanied Ronson's documentary series The Secret Rulers of the World (2001), which covered similar topics and events.

== Plot ==
Ronson chronicles his travels and interviews with various extremists including radical Islamic activist Omar Bakri Muhammad, Ku Klux Klan leader Thom Robb, Northern Irish politician Ian Paisley and film director Tony Kaye. Much of the book is dedicated to the meeting places of the Bilderberg Group.

== Reception ==
The book received mostly positive reviews.
