= Jon Ronson =

British-American journalist, author, and filmmaker

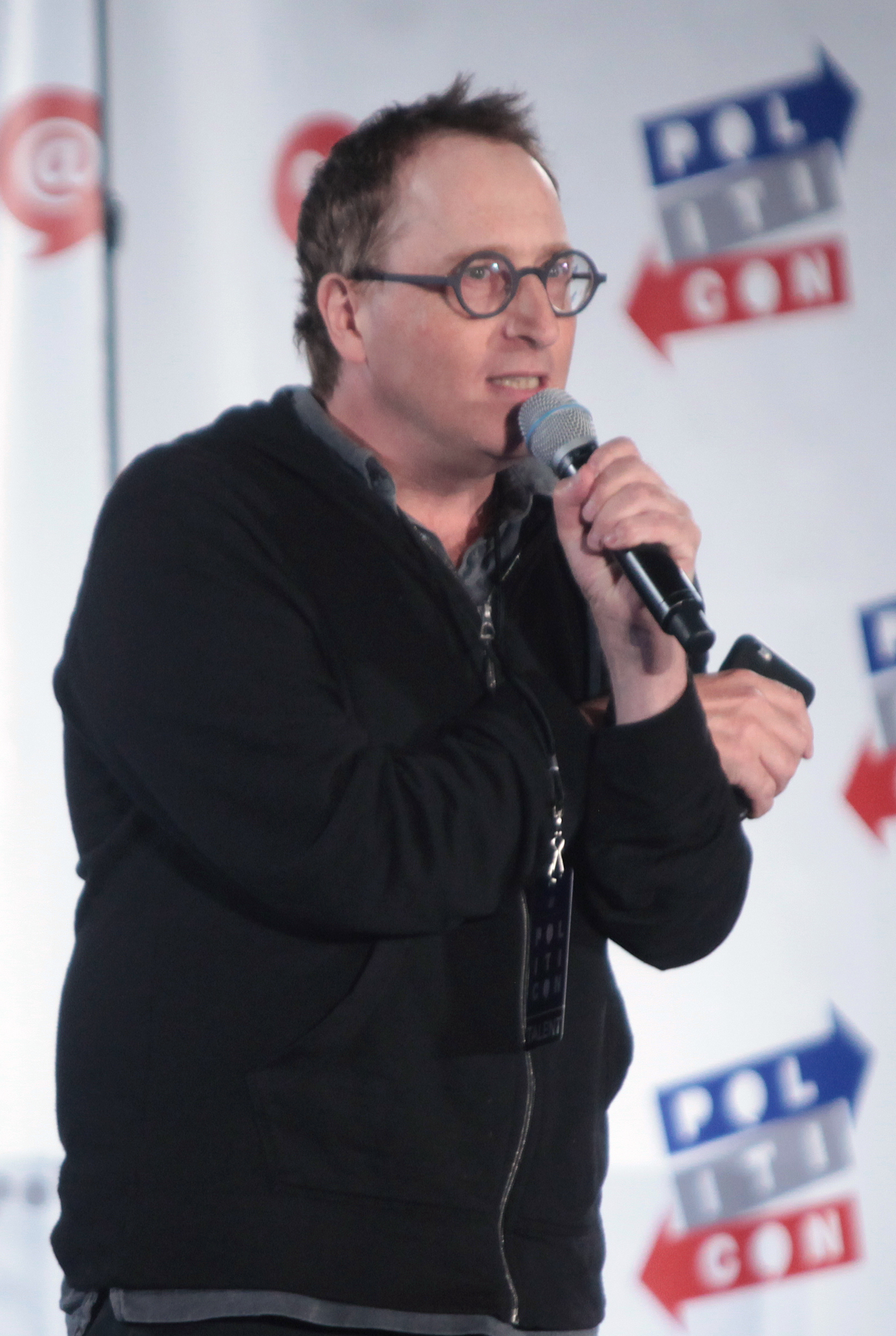
- Ronson in 2016
- Born: 10 May 1967 (age 59); Cardiff, Wales
- Education: Polytechnic of Central London
- Occupations: Journalist; author; filmmaker
- Spouse: Elaine Patterson
- Children: 1
- Writing career
- Genres: Conspiracy theories; investigative journalism; gonzo journalism
- Website: jonronson.com

Jon Ronson (born 10 May 1967) is a British journalist, author, and filmmaker. He is known for works such as Them: Adventures with Extremists (2001), The Men Who Stare at Goats (2004), and The Psychopath Test (2011).

He has been described as a gonzo journalist, becoming a faux-naïf character in his stories. He produces informal but sceptical investigations of controversial fringe politics and science. He has published nine books and his work has appeared in publications such as The Guardian, City Life and Time Out. He has made several BBC Television documentary films and two documentary series for Channel 4.

== Early life ==
Ronson was born in Cardiff on 10 May 1967. He attended Cardiff High School and later worked for CBC Radio in Cardiff, before moving to London to study for a media degree at the Polytechnic of Central London.

== Career ==
=== Writing ===
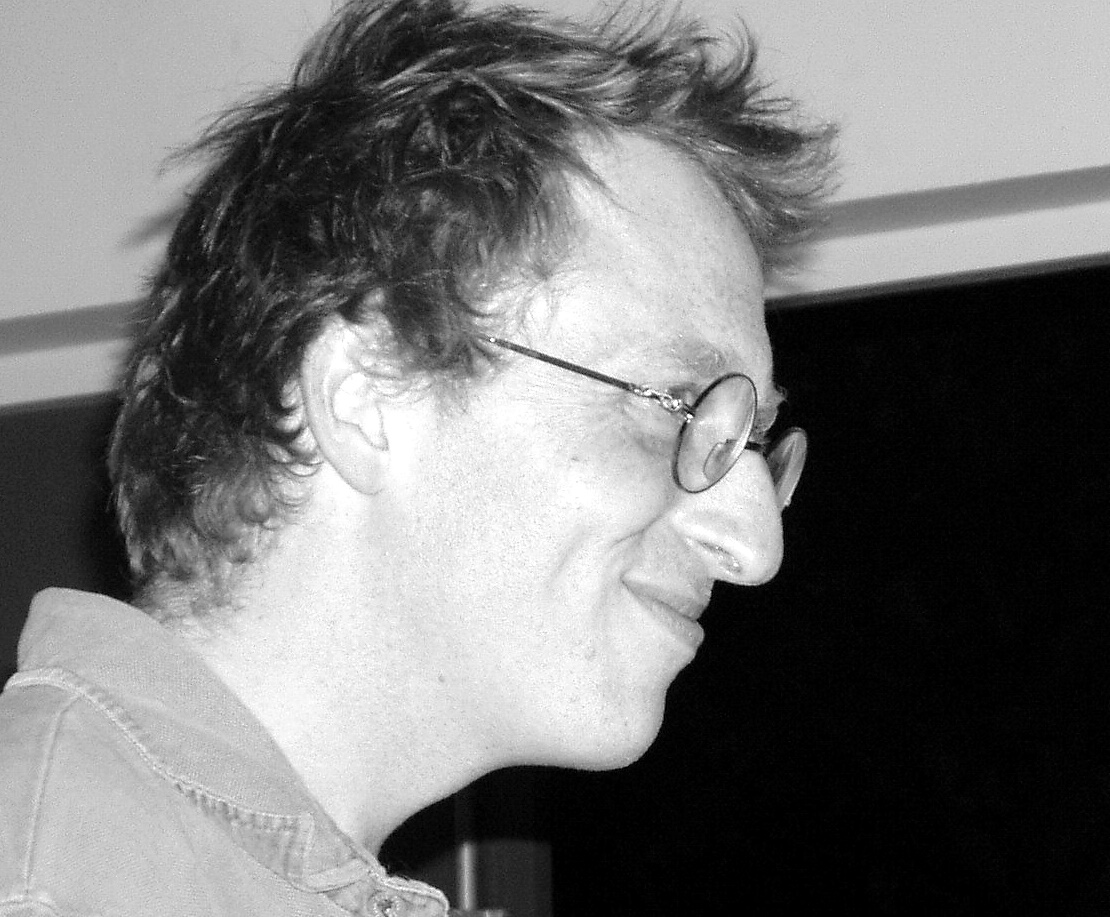
Ronson in January 2007

External videos
- Booknotes interview with Ronson on Them, March 24, 2002, C-SPAN
- Presentation by Ronson on The Men Who Stare at Goats, April 14, 2005, C-SPAN
- Presentation by Ronson on So You've Been Publicly Shamed, April 1, 2015, C-SPAN

Ronson gained fame writing a column for Time Out, consisting of a series of challenges he set himself. He later adapted this into a television series, The Ronson Mission, for BBC2 in 1993. Ronson's first book, Clubbed Class (1994), is a travelogue in which he bluffs his way into a jet set lifestyle, in search of the world's finest holiday.

His second book, Them: Adventures with Extremists (2001), chronicles his experiences with people labelled as extremists. Subjects featured in the book include David Icke, Randy Weaver, Omar Bakri Muhammad, Ian Paisley, Alex Jones, and Thomas Robb. Ronson also follows independent investigators of secretive groups such as the Bilderberg Group. The narrative tells of Ronson's attempts to infiltrate the "shadowy cabal" fabled, by these conspiracy theorists, to rule the world. Publishers Weekly noted: "It is how he reveals the all-too-real machinations of Western society's radical fringe and its various minions that makes this enjoyable work rather remarkable." The book was described by Louis Theroux as a "funny and compulsively readable picaresque adventure through a paranoid shadow world." Variety magazine announced in September 2005 that Them had been purchased by Universal Pictures for a feature film.

Ronson contributed the memoir "A Fantastic Life" to the Picador anthology Truth or Dare, in 2004.

Ronson's third book, The Men Who Stare at Goats (2004), deals with the secret New Age unit within the United States Army called the First Earth Battalion. Ronson investigates people such as Major General Albert Stubblebine III, former head of intelligence, who believed that people can walk through walls with the right mental preparation, and that goats can be killed simply by staring at them. Much was based on the ideas of Lt. Col. Jim Channon, ret., who wrote the First Earth Battalion Operations Manual in 1979, inspired by the emerging Human Potential Movement of California. The book suggests that these New Age military ideas mutated over the decades to influence interrogation techniques at Guantanamo Bay. An eponymous film of the book was released in 2009, in which Ronson's investigations were fictionalised and structured around a journey to Iraq. Ronson is played by the actor Ewan McGregor in the film.

Ronson's fourth book, Out of the Ordinary: True Tales of Everyday Craziness (2006; Picador and Guardian Books), is a collection of his Guardian articles, mostly those concerning his domestic life. A companion volume was What I Do: More True Tales of Everyday Craziness (2007).

The Psychopath Test: A Journey Through the Madness Industry (2011) is Ronson's fifth book. In it, he explores the nature of psychopathic behaviour, learning how to apply the Hare Psychopathy Checklist, and investigating its reliability. He interviews people in facilities for the criminally insane as well as potential psychopaths in corporate boardrooms. The book's findings have been rejected by The Society for the Scientific Study of Psychopathy and by Robert D. Hare, creator of the Hare Psychopathy Checklist. Hare described the book as "frivolous, shallow, and professionally disconcerting".

Lost at Sea: The Jon Ronson Mysteries (2012), Ronson's sixth book, is a collection of previously published articles by him.

Ronson's seventh book So You've Been Publicly Shamed (2015) concerns the effects of public humiliation in the internet age.

Ronson released his eighth book, The Castle: Adventures in a World of Unraveling Men, in 2026; it investigates the masculinity crisis of the 21st century.

=== Radio ===
Ronson's main radio work is the production and presentation of a BBC Radio 4 programme, Jon Ronson on... The programme has been nominated for a Sony award four times. In August 2008, Radio 4 aired "Robbie Williams and Jon Ronson Journey to the Other Side", a documentary by Jon Ronson about pop star Williams' fascination with UFOs and the paranormal.

In the early 1990s, Ronson was offered the position of sidekick on Terry Christian's Show on Manchester radio station KFM. Ronson also co-presented a KFM show with Craig Cash, who went on to write and perform in The Royle Family and Early Doors.

Ronson contributes to the American radio program This American Life. As of 2021, he has contributed segments to 13 episodes including "Them" (#201), "Naming Names" (#211), "Family Physics" (#214), "Habeas Schmabeas" (#310), "It's Never Over" (#314), "The Spokesman" (#338), "Pro Se" (#385), "First Contact" (#411), "The Psychopath Test" (#436), "Secret Identity" (#506), "Tarred and Feathered" (#522), "To Be Real" (#620), "Beware the Jabberwock" (#670).

Ronson hosted and wrote the podcast The Butterfly Effect, which was released in November 2017 by Audible and was subsequently made available on other podcasting platforms. The show concerns internet pornography, and Fabian Thylmann and PornHub's effect on the industry. Ronson subsequently also hosted and wrote the podcast The Last Days of August, released in January 2019. Its subject is the 2017 death of pornographic actress August Ames.

Ronson returned to the BBC in 2021 with Things Fell Apart: a podcast on the culture wars for BBC Sounds in a similar format to his previous works for Amazon.

=== Music ===
In the late 1980s, Ronson replaced Mark Radcliffe as the keyboard player for the Frank Sidebottom band for a number of performances.

Ronson was the manager of the Manchester indie band The Man from Delmonte.

=== Television ===
Ronson presented the late nineties talk show For the Love of..., in which each week he would interview a gathering of guests and experts on different phenomena and conspiracy theories. Ronson has also appeared as a guest on various shows, including Alan Davies: As Yet Untitled.

=== Films ===
Ronson sold the film rights to The Men Who Stare at Goats, and subsequently a film of the same name was released in 2009 as a comedy war film directed by Grant Heslov and written by Peter Straughan. According to Ronson's DVD-commentary, the journalist-character Bob Wilton (Ewan McGregor) did experience some elements of Ronson's self-recounted story from the book. However, unlike Ronson, Wilton was an American from Ann Arbor. Also, unlike Ronson, Wilton went to Iraq.

In the process of visiting the set during the shoot, Ronson began a collaborative writing project with Straughan. This was the screenplay for Frank, a 2014 black comedy inspired in part by Ronson's time in Frank Sidebottom's band.

With Bong Joon-ho, Ronson wrote the screenplay for the 2017 Netflix film Okja.

== Personal life ==
Ronson and his wife, arts journalist Elaine Patterson, have one son, Joel. He is Jewish and is a "distinguished supporter" of Humanists UK. He is a fan of the football team Arsenal FC and has spoken of his "adoration" of the club.

Ronson and Patterson moved to Manhattan in 2012. In an interview for Louis Theroux's Grounded podcast, he revealed that he became a naturalised American citizen in early 2020. As of 2026, Ronson splits his time between his Manhattan apartment and a home in Upstate New York.

== Works ==
=== Books ===
Date first published	Title	Publisher information
27 October 1994	Clubbed Class	Pavilion Books Ltd, hardcover, ISBN 1-85793-320-6
2001	Them: Adventures with Extremists	Picador, hardcover, 2001, ISBN 0-330-37545-8; Simon & Schuster, hardcover, 2002, ISBN 0-7432-2707-7; Simon & Schuster, paperback, 1 January 2003, ISBN 0-7432-3321-2
19 November 2004	The Men Who Stare at Goats	Picador, hardcover, ISBN 0-330-37547-4
3 November 2006	Out of the Ordinary: True Tales of Everyday Craziness	Picador/Guardian Books, paperback, ISBN 0-330-44832-3
2 November 2007	What I Do: More True Tales Of Everyday Craziness	Picador/Guardian Books, paperback, ISBN 0-330-45373-4
12 May 2011	The Psychopath Test: A Journey Through the Madness Industry	Riverhead Books, hardcover, ISBN 978-1-59448-801-6
22 November 2011	The Amazing Adventures of Phoenix Jones	Riverhead Books, e-book
30 October 2012	Lost at Sea: The Jon Ronson Mysteries	Penguin Group, hardcover, ISBN 978-1-59463-137-5
27 March 2014	Frank: The True Story that Inspired the Movie	Picador, paperback, ISBN 978-1-4472-7137-6
12 March 2015	So You've Been Publicly Shamed	Picador, paperback, ISBN 978-0-33049-228-7
October 2016	The Elephant in the Room: A Journey into the Trump Campaign and the 'Alt-Right'	E-book, Kindle single
October 2017	The Butterfly Effect	podcast series
3 January 2019	The Last Days of August	Audible Originals, Audio book
13 April 2023	The Debutante: From High Society to White Supremacy	Audible Originals, Audio book
20 August 2026	The Castle: Adventures in a World of Unravelling Men	Penguin Group, hardcover, ISBN 978-0241754771

=== Filmography ===
- The Ronson Mission (1993), BBC 2
- New York to California: A Great British Odyssey (1996), Channel 4
- Hotel Auschwitz (1996), BBC Radio 4
- Tottenham Ayatollah (1997), Channel 4
- Critical Condition (1997), Channel 4
- Dr Paisley, I Presume (1998), Channel 4
- New Klan (1999) Channel 4
- The Secret Rulers of the World (2001), Channel 4
- The Double Life of Jonathan King (2002), Channel 4
- Kidneys for Jesus (2003) Channel 4
- I Am, Unfortunately, Randy Newman (2004) Channel 4
- Crazy Rulers of the World (2004), Channel 4
  - Part 1: "The Men Who Stare at Goats"
  - Part 2: "Funny Torture"
  - Part 3: "The Psychic Footsoldiers"
- Death in Santaland (2007), More 4, about a foiled school shooting plot in the Christmas-themed town of North Pole, Alaska.
- Reverend Death (2008), Channel 4, about George Exoo, an advocate of euthanasia.
- Stanley Kubrick's Boxes (2008)
- Revelations (2009)
- Escape and Control (2011)
- Frank (2014)
- Okja (2017)
- Comrade Detective (2017) as Himself

=== Theatre ===
- Life and Trust (2024)
