= Bilderberg Meeting =

Annual Europe–North America forum

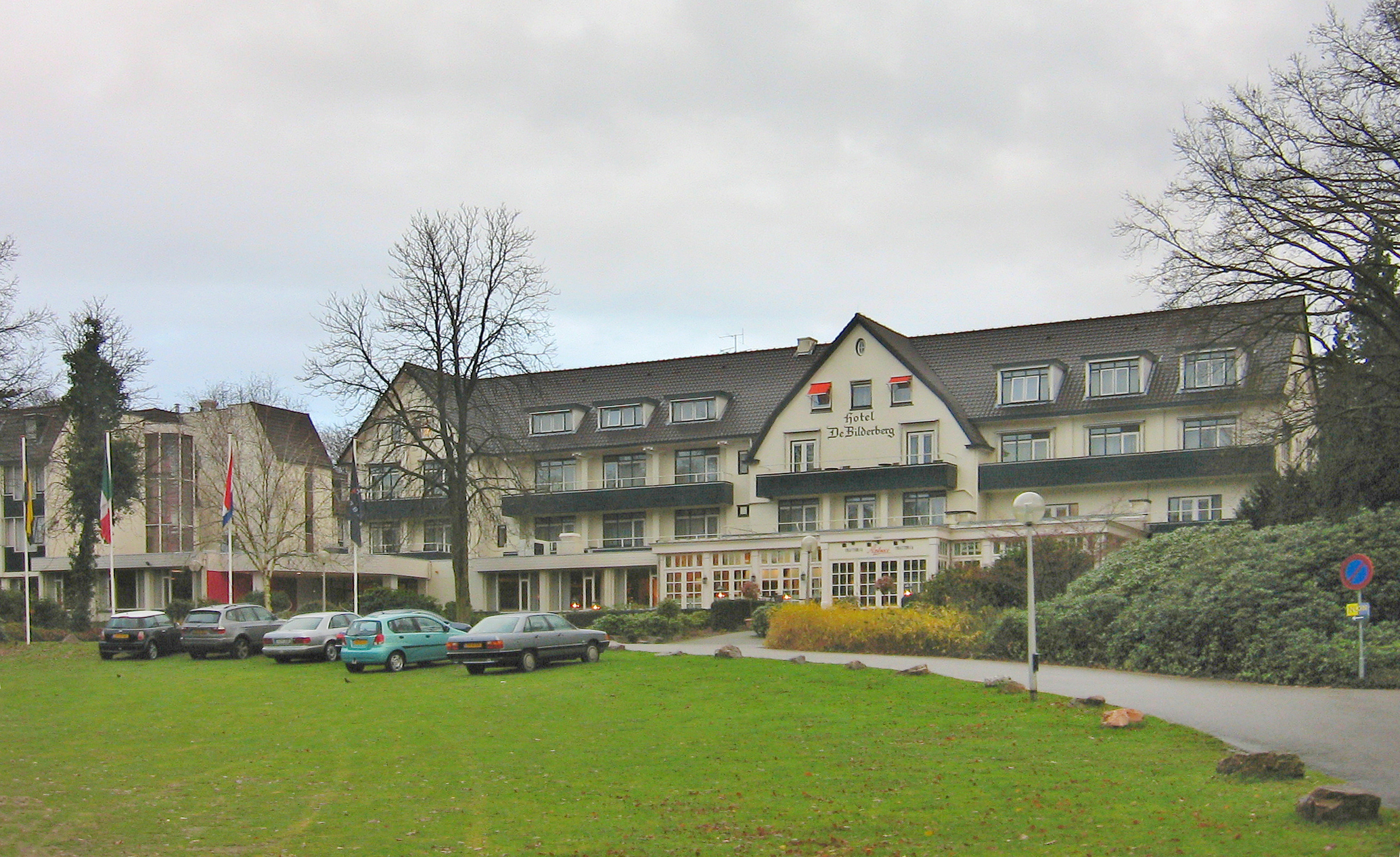
- Bilderberg Hotel in the Netherlands, eponymous location of the first conference in 1954 51.9898°N 5.8176°E
- Formation: 29 May 1954; 72 years ago
- Members: c. 150 invited, smaller core group
- Co-Chairs of the Steering Committee: Marie-Josée Kravis; Henri de Castries
- Website: bilderbergmeetings.org

The Bilderberg Meeting (also known as the Bilderberg Group, Bilderberg Conference or Bilderberg Club) is an annual off-the-record forum established in 1954 to foster dialogue between Europe and North America. The group's agenda, originally to prevent another world war, is now defined as bolstering a consensus around free market Western capitalism and its interests around the globe. Participants include political leaders, experts, captains of industry, finance, and academia, numbering between 120 and 150.

Attendees are entitled to use information gained at meetings, but not attribute it to a named speaker—an arrangement, called the Chatham House Rule, that the club says is meant to encourage candid debate while maintaining privacy. Critics from a wide range of viewpoints have called it into question, and it has drawn conspiracy theories from both the left and right.

Meetings were chaired by Prince Bernhard of the Netherlands until 1975. The current Chairman is French businessman Henri de Castries. Since 1954, the meeting has taken place every year except in 1976, when it was cancelled due to the Lockheed bribery scandals involving Prince Bernhard, and in 2020 and 2021 due to the COVID-19 pandemic. The 72nd Bilderberg Meeting took place from April 9 to 12, 2026 in Washington, D.C., US.

== Origin ==
The first conference holds its name from the location where it was first held from the 29th to the 31st of May 1954; the Bilderberg Hotel (Hotel De Bilderberg) in Oosterbeek, Netherlands. The hotel also gave its name to the attendees of the conference, the "Bilderbergers". The hotel is situated in a quiet location, approximately 7 kilometers west of the city of Arnhem. It is owned and operated by the Bilderberg hotel chain, which runs 12 hotels and an event location in the Netherlands and one hotel in Germany. At the time of the 1954 conference, it was a medium-sized family-run hotel.

The conference was initiated by several people, including Polish politician-in-exile Józef Retinger who, concerned about the growth of anti-Americanism in Western Europe, proposed an international conference at which leaders from European countries and the United States would be brought together with the aim of promoting Atlanticism—better understanding between the cultures of the United States and Western Europe to foster cooperation on political, economic, and defense issues.

Retinger approached Prince Bernhard of the Netherlands who agreed to promote the idea, together with former Belgian prime minister Paul van Zeeland, and the then head of Unilever, Paul Rijkens. Bernhard in turn contacted Walter Bedell Smith, the then head of the CIA, who asked Eisenhower adviser Charles Douglas Jackson to deal with the suggestion. The guest list was to be drawn up by inviting two attendees from each nation, one of each to represent "conservative" and "liberal" points of view. Fifty delegates from 11 countries in Western Europe attended the first conference, along with 11 Americans.

The success of the meeting led the organizers to arrange an annual conference. A permanent steering committee was established with Retinger appointed as permanent secretary. As well as organizing the conference, the steering committee also maintained a register of attendee names and contact details with the aim of creating an informal network of individuals who could call upon one another in a private capacity. Conferences were held in France, Germany, and Denmark over the following three years. In 1957, the first U.S. conference was held on St. Simons Island, Georgia, with $30,000 from the Ford Foundation. The foundation also supplied funding for the 1959 conference in Turkey and 1963 conference in France.

== Participants ==
The participants are between 120 and 150 people, including political leaders, experts from industry, finance, NATO, academia and the media. About two thirds of the participants come from Europe and the rest from North America; one third from politics and government and the rest from other fields. Historically, attendee lists have been weighted toward bankers, politicians, directors of large businesses and board members from large publicly traded corporations. Heads of state, including former King Juan Carlos I of Spain and former Queen Beatrix of the Netherlands, have attended meetings. A source connected to the group told The Daily Telegraph in 2013 that others, whose names are not publicly issued, sometimes turn up "just for the day" at the group's meetings.

The Swedish banker and industrialist Marcus Wallenberg Jr. was a member of the steering committee and attended the meeting twenty-two times from the 1950s to 1981, a year prior to his death. His grandson Marcus Wallenberg has attended it eight times and his other grandson, Jacob Wallenberg, seventeen times.

== Activities and goals ==
The group's original goal of promoting Atlanticism, strengthening US-European relations, and preventing another world war has grown. According to Andrew Kakabadse, the Bilderberg Group's theme is to "bolster a consensus around free-market Western capitalism and its interests around the globe". In 2001, Denis Healey, a Bilderberg group founder and a steering committee member for 30 years, said,

To say we were striving for a one-world government is exaggerated, but not wholly unfair. Those of us in Bilderberg felt we couldn't go on forever fighting one another for nothing and killing people and rendering millions homeless. So we felt that a single community throughout the world would be a good thing.

According to the web page of the group, the meetings are conducted under the Chatham House Rule, allowing the participants to use any information they gained during the meeting, but not to disclose the names of the speakers or any other participants. According to former chairman Étienne Davignon in 2011, a major attraction of Bilderberg group meetings is that they provide an opportunity for participants to speak and debate candidly and to find out what major figures really think, without the risk of off-the-cuff comments becoming fodder for controversy in the media. A 2008 press release from the "American Friends of Bilderberg" stated that "Bilderberg's only activity is its annual Conference and that at the meetings, no resolutions were proposed, no votes taken, and no policy statements issued." However, in November 2009, the group hosted a dinner meeting at the Château of Val-Duchesse in Brussels outside its annual conference to promote the candidacy of Herman Van Rompuy for President of the European Council.

== Organizational structure ==
Meetings are organized by a steering committee with two members from each of approximately 18 nations. Official posts include a chairman and an Honorary Secretary General. The group's rules do not contain a membership category but former participants receive the annual conference reports. The only category that exists is "member of the steering committee". Besides the committee, there is a separate advisory group with overlapping membership.

Dutch economist Ernst van der Beugel became permanent secretary in 1960, upon Retinger's death. Prince Bernhard continued to serve as the meeting's chairman until 1976, the year of his involvement in the Lockheed affair. The position of Honorary American Secretary General has been held successively by Joseph E. Johnson of the Carnegie Endowment; William Bundy of Princeton University; Theodore L. Eliot Jr., former U.S. ambassador to Afghanistan; and Casimir A. Yost of Georgetown University's Institute for the Study of Diplomacy.

According to James A. Bill, the "steering committee usually met twice a year to plan programs and to discuss the participant list".

In 2002, in Them: Adventures with Extremists, author Jon Ronson wrote that the group has a small central office in Holland which each year decides what country will host the forthcoming meeting. The host country then has to book an entire hotel for four days, plus arrange catering, transport and security. To fund this, the host solicits donations from sympathetic corporations such as Barclays, Fiat Automobiles, GlaxoSmithKline, Heinz, Nokia and Xerox.

== Chairmen of the Steering Committee ==
Chairmen of the Steering Committee of the Bilderberg Meetings		Tenure as Chairman	Country	Office(s)
Prince Bernhard of Lippe-Biesterfeld	Prince Bernhard of Lippe-Biesterfeld (1911–2004)	29 May 1954 – 29 September 1976 (22 years, 123 days)	Netherlands	Prince consort of the Netherlands (1948–1980); Inspector general of the Armed forces of the Netherlands (1970–1976); Inspector general of the Royal Netherlands Air Force (1953–1970); Inspector general of the Royal Netherlands Navy (1946–1970); Inspector general of the Royal Netherlands Army (1945–1970); Commander-in-chief of the Armed forces of the Netherlands (1944–1945)
Alec Douglas-Home, Baron Home of the Hirsel	Alec Douglas-Home, Baron Home of the Hirsel (1903–1995)	22 April 1977 – 20 April 1980 (2 years, 364 days)	United Kingdom	Prime Minister of the United Kingdom (1963–1964); Leader of the Conservative Party (1963–1965); Secretary of State for Foreign and Commonwealth Affairs (1960–1963, 1970–1974); Lord President of the Council (1957, 1959–1960); Leader of the House of Lords (1957–1960); Secretary of State for Commonwealth Relations (1955–1960); Member of the House of Lords (1951–1963, 1974–1995); Member of Parliament (1931–1945, 1950–1951, 1963–1974)
Walter Scheel	Walter Scheel (1919–2016)	15 May 1981 – 12 May 1985 (3 years, 362 days)	Germany	President of Germany (1974–1979) (Acting) Chancellor of Germany (1974); Vice-Chancellor (1969–1974); Minister of Foreign Affairs (1969–1974); Leader of the Free Democratic Party (1968–1974); Minister of Economic Cooperation (1961–1969); Member of the European Parliament (1956–1961); Member of the Bundestag (1953–1974)
Eric Roll, Baron Roll of Ipsden	Eric Roll, Baron Roll of Ipsden (1907–2005)	25 April 1986 – 14 May 1989 (3 years, 19 days)	United Kingdom	Member of the House of Lords (1977–2005)
Peter Carington, 6th Baron Carrington	Peter Carington, 6th Baron Carrington (1919–2018)	11 May 1990 – 17 May 1998 (8 years, 6 days)	United Kingdom	Secretary General of NATO (1984–1988); Secretary of State for Foreign and Commonwealth Affairs (1979–1982); Secretary of State for Energy (1974); Chairman of the Conservative Party (1972–1974); Secretary of State for Defence (1970–1974); Leader of the House of Lords (1963–1964); Minister without portfolio (1963–1964); First Lord of the Admiralty (1959–1963); High Commissioner to Australia (1956–1959); Member of the House of Lords (1941–2018)
Étienne Davignon, Viscount Davignon	Étienne Davignon, Viscount Davignon (1932–2026)	3 June 1999 – 12 June 2011 (12 years, 9 days)	Belgium	European Commissioner for Industrial Affairs and Energy (1981–1985); European Commissioner for Internal Market, Customs Union and Industrial Affairs (1977–1981)
Henri de La Croix de Castries	Henri de Castries (born 1954)	31 May 2012 – 2019 (7 years)	France	Chairman and Chief Executive Officer of Axa (2000–2016)
Victor Halberstadt	Victor Halberstadt (1939–2024)	30 April 2020 – 2024 (co-chair)	Netherlands	Crown Member of the Social and Economic Council (1972–2024)
Marie-Josée Kravis	Marie-Josée Kravis (born 1949)	30 April 2020 (co-chair)	Canada	Entrepreneur; Philanthropist; Director
Henri de La Croix de Castries	Henri de Castries (born 1954)	2025 (co-chair)	France	Chairman and Chief Executive Officer of Axa (2000–2016)

== Criticism ==
There have been long standing concerns about lobbying, since senior policymakers meet with corporate lobbyists, and in the case of the 2015 meeting even with senior figures at Transparency International.

Partly because of its working methods to ensure strict privacy and secrecy, the Bilderberg Group has been criticised for its lack of transparency and accountability. Ian Richardson sees Bilderberg as the transnational power elite, "an integral, and to some extent critical, part of the existing system of global governance", that is "not acting in the interests of the whole". Many of these critics have emphasized that they do not accept or do not believe that there is enough evidence to support the diversity of conspiracy theories that have arisen in regard to the group and that they disapprove of what they regard as their unpleasant associations and connotations. For example, an article by the English commentator Charlie Skelton in The Guardian in June 2017 criticized the world view expressed in an agenda published by the Bilderberg group without engaging in speculation about conspiratorial activities.

== Conspiracy theories ==
The secrecy of the proceedings has led not only to varied criticism of the group and its activities from across the political spectrum but also to a number of conspiracy theories, which have grown especially popular within certain political movements, although the different factions of theorists often disagree about the exact nature of the group's intentions and use different sources and levels of evidentiary rigor to back up their conjectures. Some on the left, or of less specific political affiliations, accuse the Bilderberg group either of covertly imposing or generally propping up capitalist domination and corporate power, while some on the right have accused the group of imposing or helping to prepare the way for a world government and a global planned economy. The right-wing theorists tend to treat the group as the central directorate or planning arm of the conspiracy or at least attribute considerable importance to its role, whereas most of the left-wing and more loosely-affiliated or apolitical theorists treat it as just one of a set of institutions that help to advance international corporate interests and ideology.

In 2005, Davignon discussed accusations of the group striving for a one-world government with the BBC: "It is unavoidable and it doesn't matter. There will always be people who believe in conspiracies but things happen in a much more incoherent fashion. ... When people say this is a secret government of the world I say that if we were a secret government of the world we should be bloody ashamed of ourselves."

In a 1994 report, Right Woos Left, published by the Political Research Associates, investigative journalist Chip Berlet argued that right-wing populist conspiracy theories about the Bilderberg group date back to as early as 1964 and can be found in Phyllis Schlafly's self-published book A Choice, Not an Echo, which promoted a conspiracy theory in which the Republican Party was secretly controlled by elitist intellectuals dominated by members of the Bilderberg group, whose internationalist policies would pave the way for world communism.

In August 2010, former Cuban president Fidel Castro wrote an article for the Cuban Communist Party newspaper Granma in which he cited Daniel Estulin's 2006 book The Secrets of the Bilderberg Club, which, as quoted by Castro, describes "sinister cliques and the Bilderberg lobbyists" manipulating the public "to install a world government that knows no borders and is not accountable to anyone but its own self."

Proponents of Bilderberg conspiracy theories in the United States include such groups and individuals such as the John Birch Society, political activist Phyllis Schlafly, writer Jim Tucker, political activist Lyndon LaRouche, conspiracy theorist Alex Jones, and politician Jesse Ventura, who made the Bilderberg group a topic of a 2009 episode of his TruTV series Conspiracy Theory with Jesse Ventura. Although conspiracy theories about the Bilderberg Group have gained the most widespread credence by far in the United States, some high-profile non-American proponents have raised them as well, including Moldovan-Italian writer Nicolai Lilin, Lithuanian writer Daniel Estulin and British politician Nigel Farage.

== See also ==
- Bohemian Club
- Council on Foreign Relations
- Le Cercle
- Transnational capitalist class
- Trilateral Commission
- Valdai Discussion Club
- World Economic Forum
- Dialog
