= Sandy Hook Elementary School shooting =

2012 mass shooting in Connecticut, US

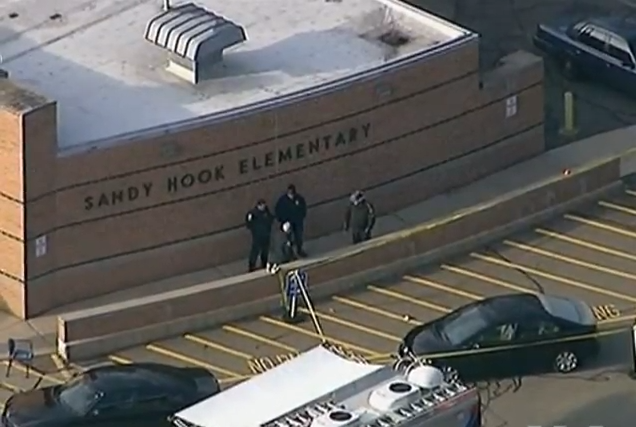
- Police at the scene of the shooting
- Location of Sandy Hook Elementary School in Newtown, Connecticut
- Location: 41°25′12″N 73°16′43″W; Sandy Hook Elementary School, Newtown, Connecticut, U.S.
- Date: December 14, 2012; 13 years ago c. 09:30 – 09:40 a.m. (EST; UTC−05:00)
- Target: Students and staff at Sandy Hook Elementary School
- Attack type: Mass shooting; murder–suicide; school shooting; pedicide; matricide; spree shooting; mass murder
- Weapons: .223 Remington Bushmaster XM-15-E2S semi-automatic rifle; 10mm Glock 20SF semi-automatic pistol (perpetrator's suicide); .22LR Savage Mark II bolt-action rifle (murder of the perpetrator's mother at home); 9mm SIG Sauer P226 semi-automatic pistol - (unused; "found on shooter's person"); 12-gauge Izhmash Saiga-12 semi-automatic shotgun (unused; left in car)
- Deaths: 28 (27 at the school, including Lanza; Lanza's mother at their home)
- Injuries: 2
- Perpetrator: Adam Lanza
- Motive: Unknown
- Litigation: Wrongful death lawsuit against Remington Arms, settled for $73 million; Defamation lawsuit against Alex Jones and Infowars, settled for $1.3 billion

On December 14, 2012, a mass shooting occurred at Sandy Hook Elementary School in Newtown, Connecticut, in which 20-year-old Adam Lanza killed 26 people—20 first-grade children and six staff members—before killing himself. Lanza had earlier fatally shot his mother at their home before driving to the school, where he forced entry by shooting out a window near the locked front entrance. He was armed with a semi-automatic rifle and two handguns and killed the victims within about five minutes, before shooting himself as police arrived. It is the deadliest mass shooting at a K–12 school in U.S. history and the fourth-deadliest mass shooting by a single perpetrator in the nation.

A November 2013 report issued by the Connecticut State Attorney's office stated that Lanza acted alone and planned his actions, but provided no indication of why he did so, or why he targeted the school. A report issued by the Office of the Child Advocate in November 2014 released that Lanza had Asperger's syndrome and, as a teenager, suffered from depression, anxiety, obsessive-compulsive disorder, and anorexia, but concluded that these factors "neither caused nor led to his murderous acts". The report went on to say, "his severe and deteriorating internalized mental health problems [...] combined with an atypical preoccupation with violence [...] (and) access to deadly weapons [...] proved a recipe for mass murder."

The shooting renewed national debate over gun control, mental health policy, and school safety. President Barack Obama visited Newtown days later and formed a federal task force on gun violence; his administration subsequently announced a series of executive actions in January 2013. Proposed federal legislation to expand background checks and restrict certain semi-automatic weapons failed in the Senate that April, though Connecticut and dozens of other states went on to pass their own gun-control measures.

Victims' families founded several gun-violence-prevention organizations after the shooting, including Sandy Hook Promise and Moms Demand Action. The attack also became the subject of persistent hoax conspiracy theories, promoted most prominently by media personality Alex Jones, who was later ordered to pay victims' families nearly $1.5 billion in defamation damages. The original school building was demolished and replaced with a new one on the same site in 2016, and a permanent memorial to the 26 victims was dedicated in 2022.

== Background ==
Sandy Hook Elementary School, which served students in kindergarten through fourth grade, was located at 12 Dickinson Drive within the Newtown Public Schools district. It was built in 1956 to relieve overcrowding in the town’s schools amid rapid population growth; Newtown’s population rose from 4,023 in 1940 to 7,448 in 1950. The building was designed by New York City architect Louis E. Jallade, whom the town chose for his specialization in school design, and stood on a 12-acre site the town had purchased from John Stefanko.

As late as November 30, 2012, 456 children were enrolled in kindergarten through fourth grade at Sandy Hook Elementary School. The school's security protocols had recently been upgraded, requiring visitors to be individually admitted after visual and identification review by video monitor. Doors to the school were locked at 9:30 a.m. each day, after morning arrivals.

Newtown is in Fairfield County, Connecticut, about 17 miles (30 km) from New Haven, 30 miles (50 km) from Hartford, and 60 miles (100 km) from New York City. Violent crime had been rare in the town of 28,000 residents; there was only one homicide in the town in the ten years before the school shooting.

Due to the Connecticut gun laws at the time, Lanza was old enough to legally carry a longarm, including all rifles and shotguns. However, Lanza would have been too young to own or carry handguns. The guns he used had been purchased legally by his mother from March 2010 leading up to January 2012. Lanza did not have a criminal record before the shooting.

=== Perpetrator ===
Adam Peter Lanza (April 22, 1992 – December 14, 2012) was born in Exeter, New Hampshire, and grew up in Newtown, Connecticut, where he was raised primarily by his mother following his parents' divorce in 2008. From an early age, he was diagnosed with a number of developmental and neurodivergent conditions, including Asperger syndrome, sensory processing disorder, and obsessive-compulsive disorder. He was described by those who knew him as highly intelligent but profoundly withdrawn. He struggled throughout his childhood and adolescence with social interaction and emotional regulation.

As a teenager, Lanza became increasingly isolated and stopped attending school. His anxiety led to him being placed on homebound status, where he received instruction at home rather than attending classes. His mother declined treatments recommended by the Yale Child Study Center, preferring to accommodate his preferences rather than forcing him to adapt to social environments and improving his mental health. Lanza developed an intense preoccupation with mass violence, compiling extensive research on prior shootings and maintaining a spreadsheet documenting past attacks. Lanza withdrew from social contact almost entirely in the years before the shooting. Lanza had access to an arsenal of legally purchased firearms belonging to his mother, who was an avid gun enthusiast. Severe mental illness, social isolation, and access to weapons were all identified as contributing factors to the shooting by Connecticut state authorities and the Office of the Child Advocate.

== Events ==
=== Murder of Nancy Lanza ===
Sometime before 9:30 a.m. EST on December 14, 2012, Lanza shot and killed his mother Nancy, aged 52, with a .22-caliber Savage Mark II rifle at their Newtown home. Investigators later found her body in her bed with four gunshot wounds to her head. Lanza then drove to Sandy Hook Elementary School in his mother's car.

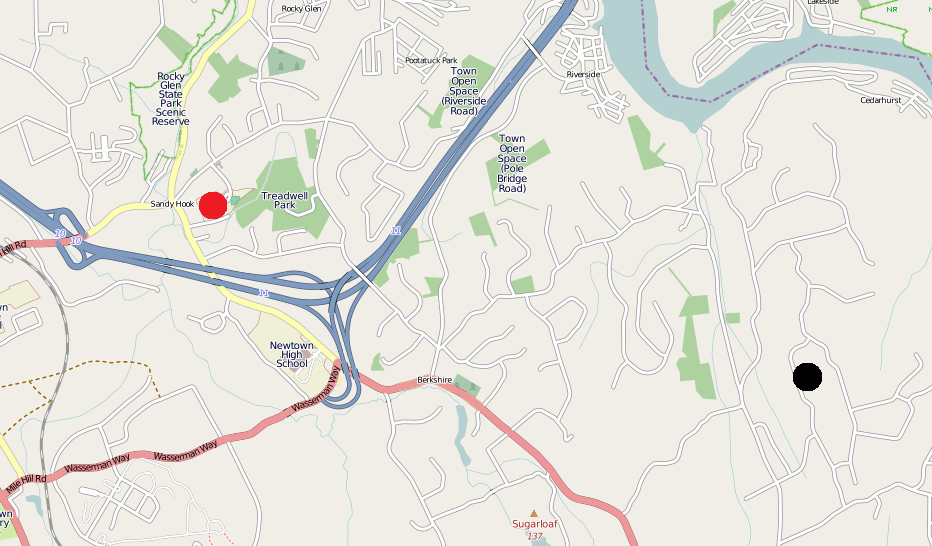
Red circle: Sandy Hook Elementary School Black circle: Lanza household

=== School shooting begins ===
Shortly after 9:35 a.m., armed with his mother's Bushmaster XM15-E2S rifle and ten magazines with 30 rounds each, Lanza shot his way through a glass panel next to the school's locked front entrance doors. He was wearing black clothing, yellow earplugs, sunglasses, a black boonie hat, fingerless gloves and an olive drab utility vest. Initial reports that he was wearing body armor were incorrect. Some of those present heard the initial shots on the school intercom system, which was being used for morning announcements.

Principal Dawn Hochsprung and school psychologist Mary Sherlach were meeting with other faculty members when they heard, but did not recognize the gunshots. Hochsprung, Sherlach, and lead teacher Natalie Hammond went into the hall to determine the source of the sounds and encountered Lanza. A faculty member who was at the meeting said that the three women called out "Shooter, stay put!", which alerted their colleagues of the danger and saved their lives. Diane Day, a school therapist who had been at the faculty meeting with Hochsprung, said that both Hochsprung and Sherlach immediately jumped up from their chairs and ran into the hallway to confront Lanza. Shari Thornberg, an aide, heard gunshots. A teacher hiding in the math lab heard school janitor Rick Thorne yell, "Put the gun down!" Lanza killed both Hochsprung and Sherlach. Hammond was hit first in the leg, and then sustained another gunshot wound. She laid still in the hallway and then, not hearing any more noise, crawled back to the conference room and pressed her body against the door to keep it closed. She was later treated at Danbury Hospital.

A nine-year-old boy said he heard the shooter say "Put your hands up!" and someone else say "Don't shoot!" He also heard many people yelling and many gunshots over the intercom while he, his classmates, and his teacher took refuge in a closet in the gymnasium. One teacher was closing a door further down the hallway, when she was hit in the foot with a bullet that ricocheted. Lanza never entered her classroom.

After killing Hochsprung and Sherlach, Lanza entered the main office but apparently did not see the people hiding there, and returned to the hallway. School nurse Sarah (Sally) Cox, 60, hid under a desk in her office. She later described seeing the door open, and Lanza's boots and legs facing her desk from approximately 20 feet (six meters) away. He remained standing for a few seconds before turning around and leaving. She and the school secretary Barbara Halstead called 911 and hid in a first-aid supply closet for nearly four hours. Janitor Rick Thorne ran through hallways, alerting classrooms.

=== Classroom shootings ===
Floorplan of Sandy Hook Elementary; Classrooms 8 (Rousseau/D'Avino), 10 (Soto/Murphy) and 12 (Roig) are labeled along with the main office (o) and Conference Room 9 (Hochsprung/Sherlach/Hammond)

Lanza entered Room 8, a first-grade classroom where Lauren Rousseau, a substitute teacher, had herded her first-grade students to the back of the room, and was trying to hide them in a bathroom, when Lanza forced his way into the classroom. Rousseau, Rachel D'Avino (a behavioral therapist who had been employed for a week at the school to work with a special needs student), and 15 students in Rousseau's class were killed. Fourteen of the children were dead at the scene; one injured child was taken to a hospital for treatment, but was later pronounced dead. Most of the teachers and students were found crowded together in the bathroom. A six-year-old girl, the sole survivor, was found by police in the classroom following the shooting. She hid in a corner of the classroom's bathroom during the shooting. Her family's pastor said she survived by playing dead. When she reached her mother, she said, "Mommy, I'm okay, but all my friends are dead." A girl who was hiding in a bathroom along with two teachers told police that she heard a boy in the classroom screaming, "Help me! I don't want to be here!", to which Lanza responded, "Well, you're here," followed by "hammering" sounds.

Lanza also went to Room 10, another first-grade classroom nearby. At this point, there are conflicting reports about the order of events. According to some reports, the classroom's teacher, Victoria Leigh Soto, had concealed some of the students in a closet or bathroom, and some of the other students were hiding under desks. Soto was walking back to the classroom door to lock it when Lanza entered the classroom. Lanza walked to the back of the classroom, saw the children under the desks, and shot them. First-grader Jesse Lewis shouted at his classmates to run for safety, and several of them did. Lewis was looking at Lanza when Lanza fatally shot him. Another account, given by a surviving child's father, said that Soto had moved the children to the back of the classroom, and that they were seated on the floor when Lanza entered. According to this account, neither Lanza nor any of the occupants of the classroom spoke. Lanza stared at the people on the floor, pointed the gun at a boy seated there, but did not fire. The boy ran out of the classroom. The final report into the shooting concluded that the sequence of events in Rooms 8 and 10 was "indeterminate".

A Hartford Courant report said that six of the children who escaped did so when Lanza stopped shooting, either because his weapon jammed or he erred in reloading it. Earlier reports said that, as Lanza entered her classroom, Soto told him that the children were in the auditorium. When several of the children came out of their hiding places and tried to run for safety, Lanza fatally shot them. Soto put herself between her students and the shooter, who then fatally shot her. Anne Marie Murphy, the special education teacher who worked with special-needs students in Soto's classroom, was also shot and killed; she was found covering six-year-old Dylan Hockley, who also died. Soto and four children were found dead in the classroom. Soto was near the north wall of the room with a set of keys nearby. One child was taken to the hospital, but was pronounced dead. Six surviving children from the class and a school bus driver took refuge at a nearby home. According to the official report released by the state's attorney, nine children ran from Soto's classroom, and police found two hiding in a class bathroom. Five of Soto's students were killed.

=== Survivors' eyewitness accounts ===
First-grade teacher Kaitlin Roig, 29 years old, hid 15 students in a bathroom and barricaded the door, telling them to be completely quiet to remain safe. It is believed that Lanza bypassed her classroom, which was the first classroom on the left side of the hallway. During a lockdown drill weeks earlier, a piece of black construction paper had been placed over the small window in the classroom door; Roig had not removed this, and with the door closed and the window covered, Lanza may have assumed the classroom was empty.

School library staff Yvonne Cech and Maryann Jacob tried to hide 18 children in a part of the library the school used for lockdown in practice drills. When they discovered that one door would not lock, they had the children crawl into a storage room, where Cech barricaded the door with a filing cabinet.

Music teacher Maryrose Kristopik barricaded her fourth-grade class inside an instrument storage closet after hearing gunshots broadcast over the school's public address system. Lanza then entered the classroom and banged on the closet door screaming "Let me in! Let me in!" The class remained completely silent inside the locked closet, and Lanza left the room without gaining entry.

Two third-grade students, chosen as classroom helpers, were walking down the hallway to the office to deliver the morning attendance sheet as the shooting began. Teacher Abbey Clements pulled both children into her classroom, where they hid.

Laura Feinstein, a reading specialist at the school, gathered two students from outside her classroom and hid with them under desks after they heard gunshots. Feinstein called the school office and tried to call 911, but could not connect due to lack of reception on her cell phone. She hid with the children for approximately 40 minutes, at which point law enforcement came to lead them out of the room.

When police interviewed survivors, a teacher recalled hearing Lanza curse several times, as well as telling them to, "Look at me!", "Come over here!", and "Look at them!"

=== Shooter's suicide ===
The police heard the final shot at 9:40:03 a.m. They believed that it was Lanza shooting himself in the lower rear portion of his head with the Glock 20SF in classroom 10. The Glock was found, apparently jammed, near Lanza's body, and the rifle was found several feet away from him. A 9mm SIG Sauer P226, which had not been fired during the incident, was also found on Lanza.

== Victims ==
Lanza shot all but two of his victims multiple times. Most of the shooting took place in two first-grade classrooms near the entrance of the school. The students among the victims totaled eight boys and twelve girls, all either six or seven years old, and the six adults were all women who worked at the school. Eighteen children were pronounced dead at the school and two were pronounced dead at Danbury Hospital. All six adults died at the school. Bullets were also found in at least three cars parked outside the school, leading police to believe that he fired at a teacher who was standing near a window.

List of casualties
| Category | People |
|---|---|
| Killed – perpetrator's mother | Nancy Lanza, 52 (shot at home) |
| Killed – school personnel | Rachel D'Avino, 29, behavior therapist; Dawn Hochsprung, 47, principal; Anne Marie Murphy, 52, special education teacher; Lauren Rousseau, 30, teacher; Mary Sherlach, 56, school psychologist; Victoria Leigh Soto, 27, teacher |
| Killed – students | Charlotte Bacon, 6; Daniel Barden, 7; Olivia Engel, 6; Josephine Gay, 7; Dylan Hockley, 6; Madeleine Hsu, 6; Catherine Hubbard, 6; Chase Kowalski, 7; Jesse Lewis, 6; Ana Márquez-Greene, 6; James Mattioli, 6; Grace McDonnell, 7; Emilie Parker, 6; Jack Pinto, 6; Noah Pozner, 6; Caroline Previdi, 6; Jessica Rekos, 6; Avielle Richman, 6; Benjamin Wheeler, 6; Allison Wyatt, 6 |
| Wounded | Natalie Hammond, 40, lead teacher; Deborah Pisani |
| Sources | |

== Police response ==
First response timeline
| Time | Event |
|---|---|
| 09:35 a.m. | Lanza is believed to first enter SHES. |
| 09:35:39 a.m. | First 911 call to Newtown Police is received. |
| 09:36:06 a.m. | 911 dispatcher broadcasts shooting at SHES. |
| 09:37:38 a.m. | Connecticut State Police dispatched to SHES. |
| 09:39:00 a.m. | First Newtown police arrives behind SHES. |
| 09:39:13 a.m. | Two more Newtown officers arrive at SHES. |
| 09:40:03 a.m. | Last shot heard. Believed to be Lanza's suicide. |
| 09:42:39 a.m. | Newtown police reports Lanza's car license plate. |
| 09:44:47 a.m. | Newtown police officers enter SHES. |
| 09:46:23 a.m. | Connecticut State Police arrive at SHES. |
| 09:46:48 a.m. | Connecticut State Police enter SHES. |

The first call to 911 was around 9:35 a.m. Newtown 911 police dispatch first broadcast that there was a shooting at Sandy Hook Elementary School (SHES) at 9:36 a.m., about 30 seconds after they received the first call. Connecticut State Police (CSP) were dispatched at 9:37 a.m. Newtown police arrived at the school street at 9:39 a.m., approximately three-and-a-half minutes after the 911 call, and Connecticut State Police arrived at the school street at 9:46 a.m. Newtown police first entered the school at 9:45 a.m., approximately nine minutes after the first 911 call and approximately ten minutes after the shooting started. This was approximately five minutes after the last shot was heard. No shots were fired by the police.

The Newtown police and Connecticut State Police mobilized local police dog, police tactical units, a bomb squad, and a state police helicopter. Police locked down the school and began evacuating the survivors room by room, escorting groups of students and adults away from the school. They swept the school for other shooters at least four times.

At approximately 10:00 a.m., Danbury Hospital sent extra medical personnel in expectation of having to treat numerous victims. Three wounded patients were evacuated to the hospital, where two children were later declared dead. The other was an unidentified adult.

The New York City medical examiner dispatched a portable morgue to assist the authorities. The victims' bodies were removed from the school and formally identified during the night after the shooting. A state trooper was assigned to each victim's family to protect their privacy and provide them with information.

On December 4, 2013, six 911 calls relating to the shooting were made public.

== Investigation ==
=== School site ===
Authorities determined that Lanza reloaded frequently during the shootings, sometimes firing only 15 rounds from a 30-round magazine. Investigators did not find a suicide note or any messages referring to the planning of the attack. Janet Robinson, superintendent of Newtown schools, said she had not found any connection between Lanza's mother and the school, in contrast to initial media reports that said Lanza's mother had worked there. Police also investigated whether Lanza was the person who had been in an altercation with four staff members at Sandy Hook School the day before the massacre. It was presumed that he killed two of the four staff members involved in the altercation (the principal and the psychologist) and wounded the third (the lead teacher) in the attack; the fourth staff member was not at the school that day. The state police said they did not know of any reports about any altercations at the school.

Police sources initially reported that Lanza's brother Ryan Lanza, then aged 24, was the perpetrator. This was probably because Adam was carrying Ryan's identification, Ryan told The Jersey Journal. Ryan, who lived in Hoboken, New Jersey, and was at his job in New York City at the time of the shooting, voluntarily submitted to questioning by New Jersey State Police, Connecticut State Police, and the Federal Bureau of Investigation. Police said he was not considered a suspect, and he was not taken into custody. Ryan said he had not been in touch with Adam since 2010; when asked why, Ryan said his brother was "sick", "[doesn't] talk to anyone", and that Ryan "didn't know him anymore." Connecticut State Police indicated their concern about misinformation being posted on social media sites and threatened prosecution of anyone involved with such activities. Ryan was also mistakenly reported to have mourned his mother and brother on social media and to have been interviewed by the New York Post. A spokesperson for the Lanza family later said an impostor gave the interview.

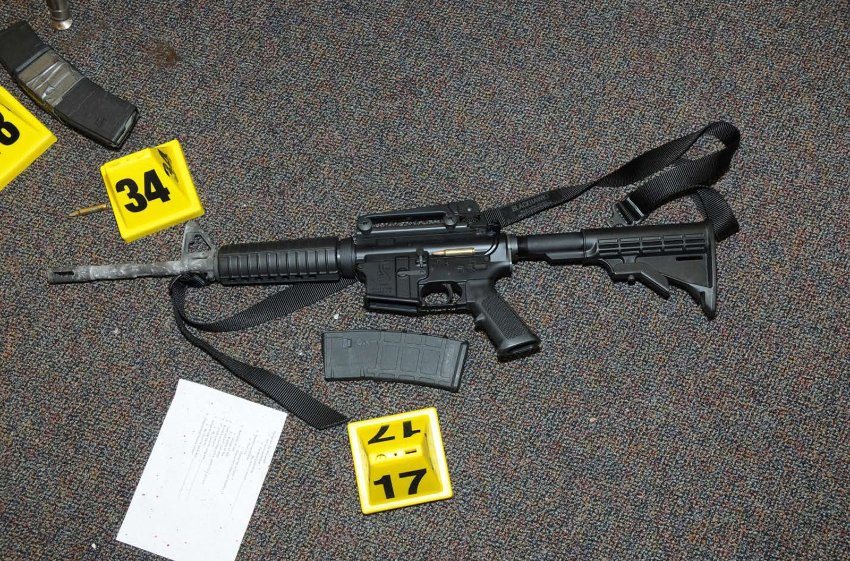
The Bushmaster XM15 rifle, along with three magazines, on the floor of Classroom 10. Two of them are taped together "jungle style" in the upper left corner.

A large quantity of unused ammunition was recovered inside the school along with three semi-automatic firearms found with Lanza: a .223-caliber Bushmaster XM15-E2S rifle, a 10mm Glock 20SF handgun, and a 9mm SIG Sauer P226 handgun. Outside the school, a 12-gauge Izhmash Saiga-12 semi-automatic shotgun was found in the car Lanza had driven to the school, a black 2010 Honda Civic.

On March 28, 2013, court documents released from the investigation showed that the shooting had occurred in the space of less than five minutes with 156 shots fired. This comprised 154 shots from the rifle and two shots from the 10mm pistol. Lanza fired one shot from the Glock in the hallway and killed himself with another shot from the pistol to the head.

After the town clerk's office was inundated with requests from the media, Connecticut House of Representatives Republican Dan Carter introduced legislation that would restrict access to public information available under the Freedom of Information Act. On June 5, both houses (Senate and House of Representatives) of the Connecticut state legislature passed a bill modifying the state's Freedom of Information Act in order to "prevent the release of crime-scene photos and video evidence from the Sandy Hook Elementary School massacre and other Connecticut homicides, concerned such records would be spread on the Internet." The bill then went on to Gov. Dannel P. Malloy's desk for his signature. The bill creates a new exemption to the state's Freedom of Information Act. The release of photographs, film, video, digital or other visual images depicting a homicide victim is prevented if such records "could reasonably be expected to constitute an unwarranted invasion of the personal privacy of the victim or the victim's surviving family members."

=== Lanza's house ===
Shortly after the shooting, police announced that Lanza used the rifle to kill the victims at the school. At a press conference on December 15, Dr. H. Wayne Carver II, the Chief Medical Examiner of Connecticut, was asked about the wounds, and replied "All the ones that I know of at this point were caused by the long weapon." When asked if the children suffered before dying, Carver replied by stating that "If so, not for very long." Carver, whose office autopsied the victims and who personally performed seven, said the injuries were "devastating" and that parents identified their children from photographs to spare them the sight. All the child victims were first-graders, and all were killed with the Bushmaster XM15. Carver said the bullets used were "designed in such a fashion the energy is deposited in the tissue so the bullet stays in."

Investigators evaluated Lanza's body, looking for evidence of drugs or medication through toxicology tests. Unusually for an investigation of this type, DNA testing of Lanza was utilized. The results of the toxicology report were published in October 2013, and stated that no alcohol or drugs were found in his system. Lanza's autopsy showed no tumors or gross deformities in his brain.

Lanza removed the hard drive from his computer and intentionally damaged it before the shooting, creating a challenge for investigators to recover data. As of the final report's publication, recovering data from the damaged drive had proven unsuccessful. Police believe that Lanza extensively researched earlier mass shootings, as they had found that Lanza had videos relating to the Columbine High School massacre and other shootings downloaded onto another hard drive, along with two videos of suicide by gunshot.

Details of the investigation were reported by law enforcement officials at a meeting of the International Association of Police Chiefs and Colonels held during the week of March 11, 2013. An article published in the New York Daily News on March 17, 2013, provided purported details of this report by an anonymous law enforcement veteran who had attended the meeting. The source stated that the investigation had found that Lanza had created a 7-by-4-foot sized spreadsheet listing around 500 mass murderers (which later turned out to be around 400), which was considered to have taken years of work and to have been used by Lanza as a "score sheet." On March 18, 2013, Lt. Paul Vance of the Connecticut State Police responded that the information from this meeting was "law enforcement sensitive information" and considered the release to be a leak.

The March 28 documents also provided details on items found at Lanza's home, including three samurai swords, a newspaper article about the Northern Illinois University shooting, and a National Rifle Association certificate. The NRA denied that Lanza or Nancy Lanza were members, and reporters noted that the NRA site provides training certificate completion templates for courses offered by NRA Certified Instructors. A gun safe was found in a bedroom and investigators found more than 1,400 rounds of ammunition and other firearms. At home, Lanza had access to three more firearms: a .45 Henry rifle, a .30 Enfield rifle, and a .22 Marlin rifle. These were legally owned by Lanza's mother. According to Time, authorities also found a photograph of Lanza holding a gun to his head at his home following his death.

According to The New York Times, law enforcement officials commented that Lanza would spend most of his time in his basement doing solitary activities. According to the same officials, it also appeared that Lanza "may have taken target practice in the basement." The Hartford Courant reported that Lanza had edited Wikipedia articles related to mass shootings with the username Kaynbred.

=== Final reports ===
==== State Attorney's report ====
The final report of the State Attorney summarizing the investigation into the shooting was published on November 25, 2013. It concluded that Lanza had acted alone, and that the case was closed. The report noted that "[Lanza] had a familiarity with and access to firearms and ammunition and an obsession with mass murders, in particular the April 1999 shootings at Columbine High School in Colorado." The report did not identify a specific motive for the shooting, stating, "The evidence clearly shows that the shooter planned his actions, including the taking of his own life, but there is no clear indication why he did so, or why he targeted Sandy Hook elementary school."

On the question of Lanza's state of mind, the report noted "significant mental health issues that affected his ability to live a normal life and to interact with others, even those to whom he should have been close ... What contribution this made to the shootings, if any, is unknown as those mental health professionals who saw him did not see anything that would have predicted his future behavior." The report found no evidence that Lanza had taken drugs or medication that would have affected his behavior, and observed, "'Why did the shooter murder twenty-seven people, including twenty children?' Unfortunately, that question may never be answered conclusively, despite the collection of extensive background information on the shooter through a multitude of interviews and other sources."

On December 27, 2013, police released thousands of pages of documents pertaining to the investigation. In accordance with law, the names of victims and witnesses were redacted or withheld. The summary report included information about items found on Lanza's computer equipment, including writings and material about previous mass shootings. A former teacher of Lanza's noted that he exhibited antisocial behavior, rarely interacted with other students, and was obsessed with writing "about battles, destruction and war."

==== Federal Bureau of Investigation's report ====
The FBI released 1,500 pages related to the shooting in 2017. In July 2014, the FBI interviewed the victims' families, neighbors of Adam Lanza, and friends of his family at a hotel in Southbury, Connecticut. The FBI also reviewed Lanza's house, journal writings, and Internet activity. The FBI did not discern a motive for the shooting.

==== Report of the Office of the Child Advocate ====
The Report of the Office of the Child Advocate concluded: "There was not one thing that was necessarily the tipping point driving Lanza to commit the Sandy Hook shooting. Rather there was a cascade of events, many self-imposed, that included: loss of school; absence of work; disruption of the relationship with his one friend; virtually no personal contact with family; virtually total and increasing isolation; fear of losing his home and of a change in his relationship with Mrs. Lanza, his only caretaker and connection; worsening OCD; depression and anxiety; profound and possibly worsening anorexia; and an increasing obsession with mass murder occurring in the total absence of any engagement with the outside world. Adam increasingly lived in an alternate universe in which ruminations about mass shootings were his central preoccupation."

The authors also noted that despite multiple developmental and mental health problems, Lanza had not received adequate mental health treatment. They wrote: "It is fair to surmise that, had Lanza's mental illness been adequately treated in the last years of his life, one predisposing factor to the tragedy of Sandy Hook might have been mitigated."

The report also tentatively disagreed with the conclusions of the State Attorney about why Lanza targeted Sandy Hook. They noted that "According to the FBI, shooters are likely to target places or people that are familiar to them ... The elementary school may have been targeted because he could overpower people, a dynamic that is very important for mass shooters as they do not want to be thwarted."

== Legal proceedings ==
=== Nancy Lanza's estate ===
In January 2015, the families of two of the first-graders who died in the shooting filed a lawsuit against the city of Newtown and the Newtown Board of Education alleging inadequate security at the school. On May 7, 2018, judgement was published on the side of the defendants, concluding in part that "the court has decided that the plaintiffs' claims against the defendants are barred by governmental immunity". In March 2015, it was announced that parents of children and teachers killed in the shooting had filed lawsuits against the estate of Nancy Lanza. The suits were based on a claim that she did not properly secure her firearms, which allowed her son, a person with mental health issues, to gain access to them. The attorneys representing the families said Lanza was believed to have had homeowner's insurance on her home worth more than $1 million and they were seeking compensation based on that. The case was settled in December 2015, with 16 plaintiffs sharing a $1.5 million payment from Nancy's estate.

=== James Fetzer ===
On October 16, 2019, a jury awarded Leonard Pozner $450,000 (equivalent to $566,673 in 2025) for defamation by James Fetzer, who had co-written the book Nobody Died at Sandy Hook. The book claimed that Pozner had fabricated the death certificate of his son Noah, a six-year-old victim of the shooting. Fetzer said he would appeal the decision. Fetzer petitioned for an appeal, which was denied, to which he petitioned for a rehearing, which was also denied.

=== Remington ===
On December 15, 2014, nine families of the 26 victims of the shooting filed a class-action lawsuit in Connecticut against Bushmaster, Remington Arms, Camfour, a distributor of firearms, and the now-closed East Windsor store, Riverview Sales, where the gunman's rifle was purchased, seeking "unspecified" damages, claiming an exemption from the 2005 Federal Protection of Lawful Commerce in Arms Act (PLCAA) that would normally disallow such a suit as lacking standing. They were represented by Josh Koskoff. The plaintiffs allege that the XM15-E2S is suitable only for military and policing applications and that Bushmaster inappropriately marketed it to civilians. In January 2015, Bushmaster's attorneys petitioned to have the suit moved to federal court because, although the shooting took place in Connecticut, it is located in North Carolina. In February 2015, the victims' families' attorneys made a motion to move the suit back to state court. On April 14, 2016, a Connecticut court denied the defendants' motion to summarily dismiss the case. Lawyers for the defense filed a second motion for dismissal a month later. On October 14, 2016, the defendants' motion to dismiss the lawsuit was granted. The judge ruled the complaint was not valid per federal and Connecticut laws.

The families appealed to the Connecticut Supreme Court. In March 2019, the court decided in a 4–3 vote to reverse parts of the trial court's rulings and remand the case back to Bridgeport Superior Court for additional hearings. It ruled that the families' appeal to the Connecticut Unfair Trade Practices Act, demonstrating that the gun manufacturers had used advertising that presented the weapons in an "unfair, unethical, or dangerous manner", with Remington seeking to "expand the market for [its] assault weapons through advertising campaigns that encouraged consumers ... to launch offensive assaults against their perceived enemies", was not prohibited by PLCAA, and thus that the plaintiffs had sufficient standing to argue their case at trial court. It also ruled that the plaintiffs can subpoena internal documents on how gun companies have marketed the AR-15. Remington asked the Supreme Court of the United States to review the state court ruling, but in November 2019 the Supreme Court declined to hear the appeal, allowing the families' suit to proceed.

On July 26, 2021, a judge refused to dismiss the lawsuit. In court documents the next day, Remington offered $33 million to be shared by the nine families. On February 15, 2022, Remington agreed to settle for $73 million, according to the families' attorney, Josh Koskoff.

=== Alex Jones ===
On April 17, 2018, radio host and conspiracy theorist Alex Jones was sued for defamation by three parents whose children were killed in the shooting. Prior to this, Jones said that the Sandy Hook shooting was "completely fake" and a "giant hoax" perpetrated by opponents of the Second Amendment. Jones claims he later believed the shooting was real. On May 23, 2018, six more families sued Jones for his claims. Jones was found to be in contempt of court by a Texas judge before the trial started, for failing to produce witnesses and materials relevant to the procedures. Consequently, Jones and Infowars were fined a total of $126,000 in October and December 2019.

In October 2021, Jones was ordered to pay damages and was criticized by a judge for failing to hand over documents requested by the courts. Jones declared bankruptcy in April 2022 as a result of the defamation lawsuits caused by his claims that the shooting was a hoax. On August 4, 2022, Jones was ordered to pay $4.1 million compensatory damages to Sandy Hook parents and, on August 5, 2022, he was ordered to pay a further $45.2 million in punitive damages. A separate case filed in Connecticut reached a verdict on October 12, 2022, and ordered Jones to pay an additional $965 million in damages to the families of Sandy Hook victims.

On November 14, 2024, Infowars and its associated brands were sold to The Onion at auction after a special deal was reached with the victim's families, allowing The Onion to become the top bidder above a company affiliated with Jones. However, in December 2024, a U.S. bankruptcy judge blocked the sale, ruling that the bankruptcy auction had failed to encourage the best possible bids.

In February 2025, Judge Christopher Lopez also denied a new auction for the site.

On May 1, 2026, the Infowars website went offline after nobody paid the state-appointed receiver to rent the studio and website.

== Aftermath ==
=== School and community recovery ===
New Sandy Hook Elementary school

The school was closed indefinitely following the shooting, partially because it remained a crime scene. Its students resumed classes on January 3, 2013, at Chalk Hill Middle School in neighboring Monroe, a vacant building that was refurbished for the purpose and temporarily renamed Sandy Hook. The University of Connecticut established a scholarship for the surviving children.On January 31, the Newtown school board voted unanimously to request a police presence in all of the district’s elementary schools; Sandy Hook had not previously had one.

Several organizations formed in response to the shooting. Sandy Hook Promise, founded by relatives of victims in 2013, develops violence-prevention programs for schools, and the Jesse Lewis Choose Love Movement, named for a child killed in the shooting, promotes social and emotional learning. Moms Demand Action, founded by Shannon Watts the day after the shooting, later merged with Mayors Against Illegal Guns to form Everytown for Gun Safety, which advocates for gun control.

In May 2013, a 28-member town task force recommended demolishing the school and building a replacement, and in October Newtown residents approved the plan by 4,504 votes to 558, with the state contributing $50 million. Demolition began on October 25 and was finished that December at a cost of nearly $1.4 million. The new building, which has security features including reinforced glass, perimeter fencing and fortified safe rooms, was unveiled to parents in July 2016. The town also acquired the Lanza family home in 2014 at no cost and demolished it in March 2015, keeping the land as open space.

In 2013, Newtown appointed a commission to plan a permanent memorial, which chose a design by SWA Group from 189 submissions. Voters narrowly approved $3.7 million for construction in April 2021, and the memorial opened to the public on November 13, 2022, after a private ceremony for victims’ families.

=== Gun control ===
U.S. states that enacted major gun control legislation after the Sandy Hook shooting, 2013–2015

The shooting renewed national debate over gun control, including proposals for universal background checks and bans on certain semi-automatic firearms and magazines holding more than ten rounds. Within hours, a White House petition asked for gun-control legislation in Congress, and the Brady Campaign to Prevent Gun Violence reported that a surge of donations briefly crashed its website. Five days after the shooting, President Barack Obama said he would make gun control a central issue of his second term and created a task force led by Vice President Joe Biden. In January 2013, he signed 23 executive orders and proposed 12 measures for Congress, including universal background checks, an assault weapons ban, and a ten-round magazine limit.

National Rifle Association executive vice president Wayne LaPierre argued that gun-free school zones attract attackers and that another gun ban would not protect Americans. He called on Congress to fund armed police officers in every school and announced that the NRA would create the National School Shield Emergency Response Program to help. After LaPierre's press conference, the Brady Campaign asked for donations to support its gun control advocacy and asked NRA members to join its campaign. Former Congresswoman Gabby Giffords, who was wounded in a 2011 Tucson shooting, founded the gun-control group Americans for Responsible Solutions, which aimed to match the fundraising of the NRA and similar groups.

New York was the first state to act, enacting its Secure Ammunition and Firearms Enforcement (SAFE) Act in January 2013. In April, Connecticut passed a major bipartisan bill, signed by Governor Dannel Malloy, that required universal background checks, banned the sale of magazines holding more than ten rounds, added more than 100 firearms to the state's assault weapons ban, and created what was described as the first registry of dangerous-weapon offenders in the United States. Gun-rights groups protested the bill and challenged it in court, but a federal judge upheld it in 2014. Maryland also tightened its gun laws, while ten other states loosened restrictions.

Legislation introduced in the 113th Congress included the Assault Weapons Ban of 2013 and the Manchin–Toomey amendment to expand background checks. The Senate defeated both on April 17, 2013.

== Responses ==
=== Government officials ===
Obama's address in reaction to the shooting

President Obama delivers remarks at an interfaith prayer vigil for the victims of the shooting

President Barack Obama gave a televised address on the day of the shootings: "We're going to have to come together and take meaningful action to prevent more tragedies like this, regardless of the politics." Obama expressed "enormous sympathy for families that are affected". He also ordered flags to be flown at half-staff at the White House and other U.S. federal government facilities worldwide in respect of the victims. On December 16, Obama traveled to Newtown where he met with victims' families and spoke at an interfaith vigil.

Dannel Malloy, the governor of Connecticut, addressed the media the evening of the shootings near a local church holding a vigil for the victims, urging the people of Connecticut to come together and help each other. Malloy said, "Evil visited this community today, and it is too early to speak of recovery, but each parent, each sibling, each member of the family has to understand that Connecticut, we are all in this together, we will do whatever we can to overcome this event, we will get through it." Hundreds of mourners, including Malloy, attended vigils in various churches in Newtown. On December 17, Malloy called for a statewide moment of silence and church bells to be tolled 26 times at 9:30 a.m. on December 21, exactly one week after the school shooting.

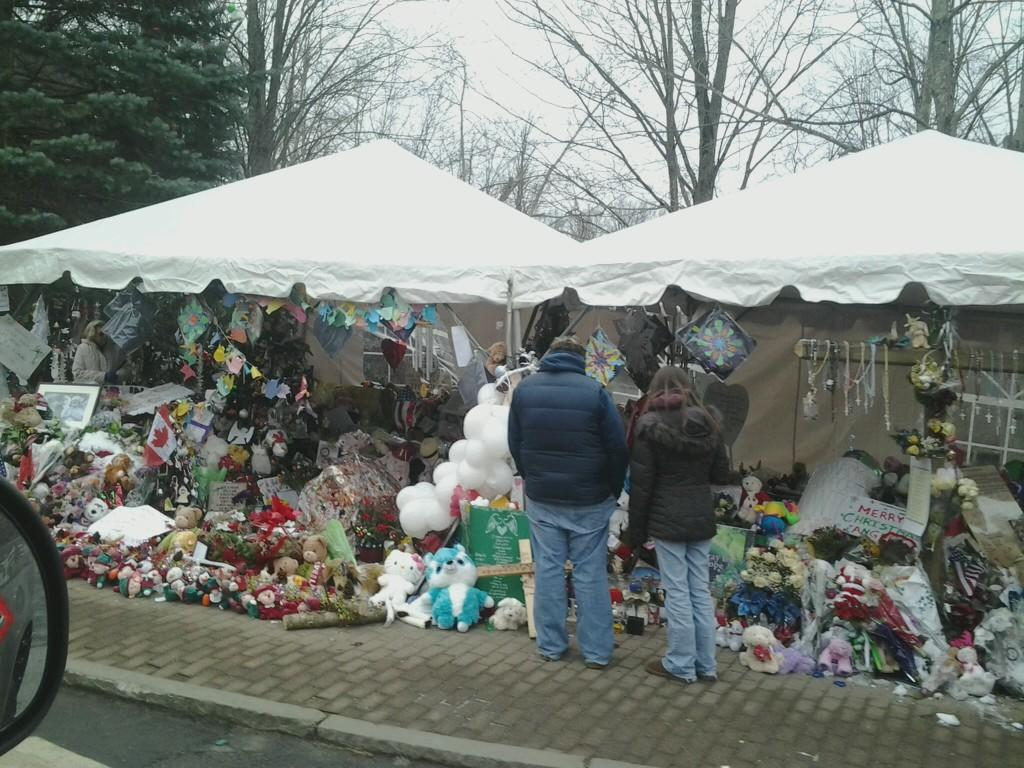
A makeshift memorial on Berkshire Road in Sandy Hook

U.S. Secretary of Education Arne Duncan said: "our thanks go out to every teacher, staff member, and first responder who cared for, comforted, and protected children from harm, often at risk to themselves. We will do everything in our power to assist and support the healing and recovery of Newtown."

The day after the shootings, Lanza's father released a statement:

Our hearts go out to the families and friends who lost loved ones and to all those who were injured. Our family is grieving along with all those who have been affected by this enormous tragedy. No words can truly express how heartbroken we are. We are in a state of disbelief and trying to find whatever answers we can. We too are asking why. We have cooperated fully with law enforcement and will continue to do so. Like so many of you, we are saddened, but struggling to make sense of what has transpired.

Leaders from other countries and organizations throughout the world also offered their condolences through the weekend after the shooting.

President Obama posthumously honored the six adults with the 2012 Presidential Citizens Medal on February 15, 2013. President Obama said "And then when Dawn Hochsprung, and Mary Sherlach, Vicki Soto, Lauren Rousseau, Rachel D'Avino, Anne Marie Murphy—when they showed up for work at Sandy Hook Elementary on December 14th of last year, they expected a day like any other—doing what was right for their kids; spent a chilly morning readying classrooms and welcoming young students—they had no idea that evil was about to strike. And when it did, they could have taken shelter by themselves. They could have focused on their own safety, on their own wellbeing. But they didn't. They gave their lives to protect the precious children in their care. They gave all they had for the most innocent and helpless among us. And that's what we honor today—the courageous heart, the selfless spirit, the inspiring actions of extraordinary Americans, extraordinary citizens."

Sandy Hook conspiracy theories have become social phenomena, despite overwhelming contemporary coverage of the incident.

=== Video games ===
A renewed debate about the effects violent video games have on young people began soon after the shooting, due to news reports suggesting Lanza frequently played violent video games. Wayne LaPierre publicly blamed video games for the shooting, specifically targeting the free online game Kindergarten Killer, created by Gary Short.

Police found numerous video games in the basement of Lanza's home, which was used as a gaming area. The final report into the shooting by the State Attorney, published in November 2013, noted that "[Lanza] played video games often, both solo at home and online. They could be described as both violent and non-violent. One person described the shooter as spending the majority of his time playing non-violent video games, with his favorite at one point being Super Mario Bros."

The report described his liking for Dance Dance Revolution, which he played frequently for long stretches of time at a movie theater in Danbury which had a commercial version of the game, and also owned a console version of at home. Dance Dance Revolution is a non-violent exercising game where "the user is required to move their feet rhythmically in response to video cues". According to the Report by the Office of the Child Advocate, Lanza would play the game for hours on end using it as a distraction from his inner turmoil. The report said "he would whip himself into a frenzy, a behavior consistent, possibly, with a need to contain anxiety-producing impulses and thoughts. There were days when he would not do anything else but Dance Dance Revolution."

The final report by the State's Attorney did not make a link between video games and the motive for the shooting. However, the Report of the Child Advocate said "video game and internet addiction appear to be 'highly comorbid with several other psychiatric disorders' including anxiety, depression, and obsessive compulsive challenges".

== Legacy ==
Many organizations were created due to the massacre that work to promote an end to school shootings, with some, such as Jesse Lewis Choose Love Movement, Sandy Hook Promise, and Safe and Sound Schools organized and led by parents of victims, while others, such as Moms Demand Action, were created by outsiders outraged by the shooting. As of 2022, the Sandy Hook Elementary School shooting is the deadliest K-12 school shooting in US history.

=== Effect on the community ===
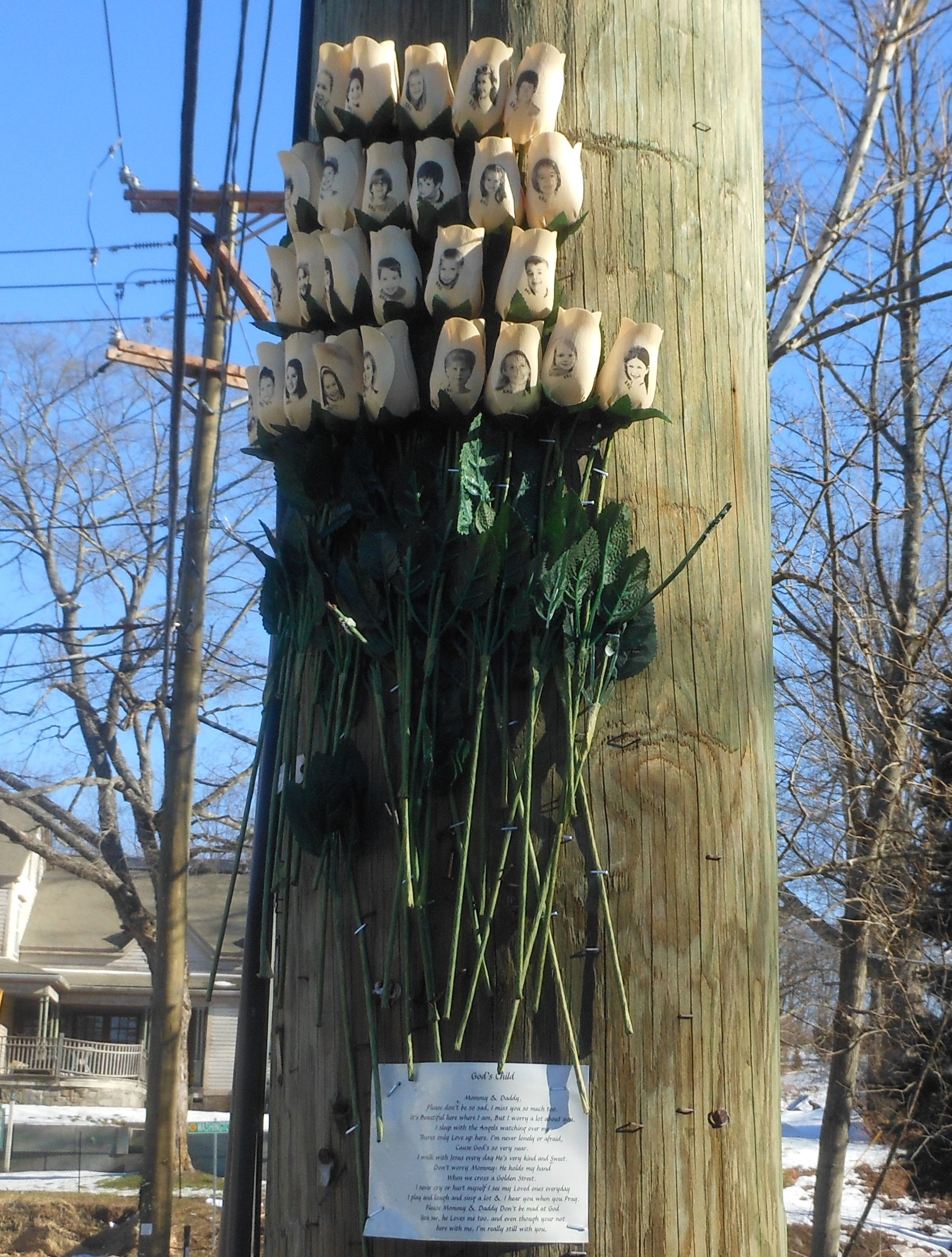
Roses featuring images of victims of the Sandy Hook Elementary School shooting

==== 2014 ====
In March 2014, the Newtown city officials announced the design for the new Sandy Hook Elementary School. The only remnant of the original school would be its flagpole.

A few days later, the Newtown-Sandy Hook Community Foundation released results of a survey with over 1,600 respondents. Among other inquiries, the survey asked residents what should be done with the balance of the $11 million in donations that had been received since the incident in 2012. The majority of responses said that money for mental health counseling and other family expenses should be the top priorities. A few responses suggested that some of the money should be used to purchase and tear down the shooter's family home in order to replace it with a park or wildlife sanctuary. Jennifer Barahona, the foundation's executive director, was quoted as saying, "That's not something we're considering at this time. It's really outside of our scope."

On October 21, building site preparation work began on the new Sandy Hook Elementary School; project updates and progress were posted on a dedicated website. Citing security and privacy reasons and respect for the families of victims, no groundbreaking ceremony was held. Construction was scheduled to begin in March 2015 with the school expected to open by December 2016.

In December, it was announced that the town of Newtown will acquire the property and home of Nancy Lanza at no cost. The property at 36 Yogananda St. was part of the Lanza estate, to which surviving son Ryan Lanza is the sole heir. Lanza's attorney, Kenneth Gruder, arranged for the transfer through a series of transactions so that probate records would not show the city acquiring the property from the Lanza family. Gruder said the notoriety of the home had made it essentially unsalable. The home was demolished in March 2015.

==== 2015 ====
On January 21, 2015, Newtown Legislative Council voted unanimously to demolish the house where Nancy and Adam Lanza lived, and to keep the land as open space. The demolition was completed on March 24, 2015.

In February 2015, the family of one of the victims, Victoria Soto, applied for trademark protection for her name. The reason for this was to help prevent others from misusing Soto's name on social media and for the benefit of the memorial fund set up in her name. The victim's sister, Jillian, said fake social media accounts existed using her sister's name to promote conspiracy theories about the shooting.

==== 2016 ====
In July 2016, the new Sandy Hook Elementary School was unveiled and parents were shown around the building. The design of the new school incorporates numerous security features, including bulletproof glass exteriors, fencing around the perimeter of the building, and fortified safe rooms. The new school is on the site of the building where the shooting took place, which was demolished and rebuilt with a state grant of around $50 million.

==== 2019 ====
In March 2019, Jeremy Richman, the father of victim Avielle Richman, was found dead of an apparent suicide. His wife said that he "succumbed to the grief that he could not escape."

==== 2024 ====
On June 12, 2024, around 60 students who had survived the shooting graduated from Newtown High School. At a ceremony to mark the event, Principal Kimberly Longobucco read out the names of those who died, followed by a moment of silence.

== Memorial ==
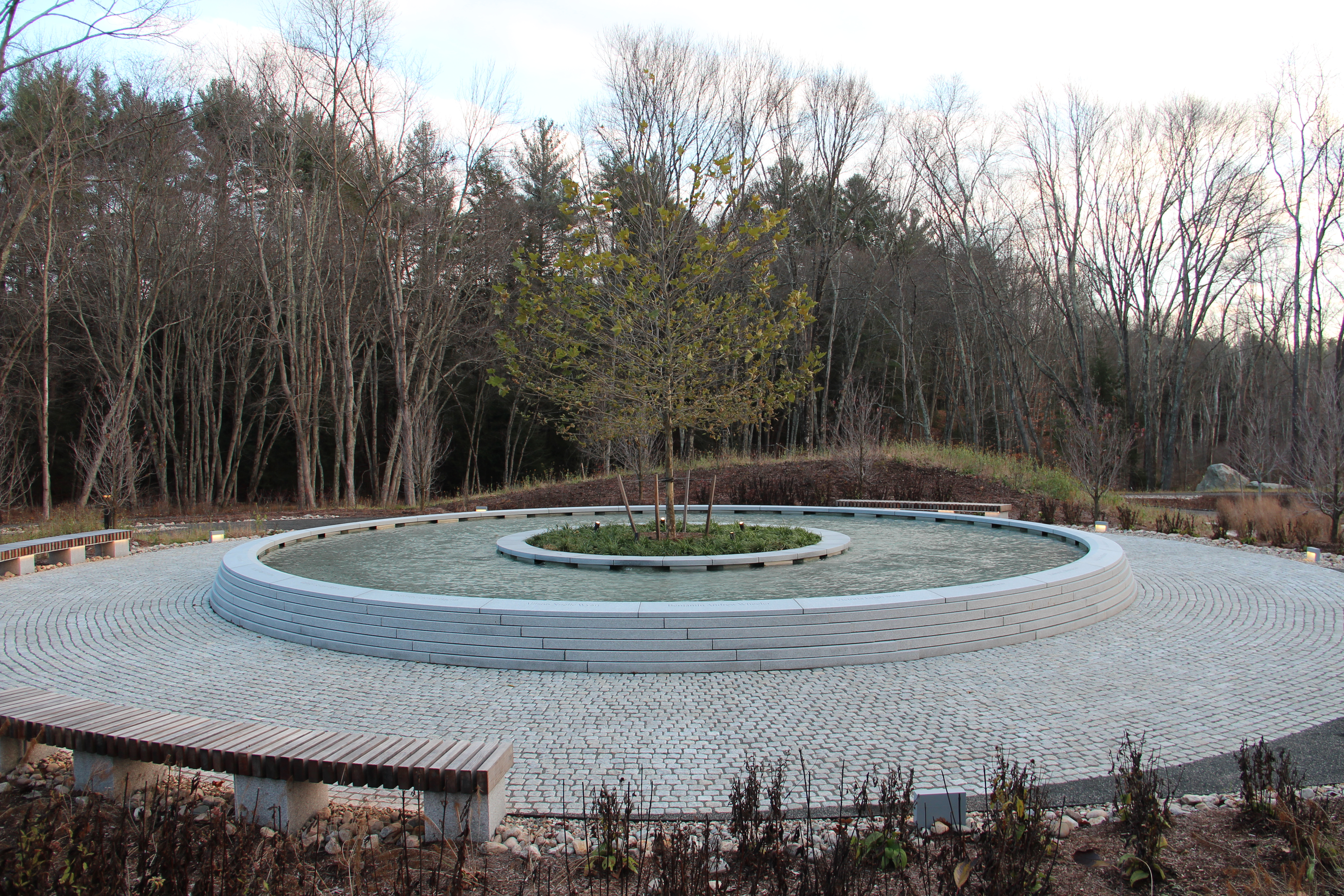
Sandy Hook Memorial in the woods behind Sandy Hook Elementary School

In 2013, the Newtown board of selectmen appointed the Sandy Hook Permanent Memorial Commission. Out of 189 design submissions, the commission chose a design created by Dan Affleck and Ben Waldo of SWA Group. $3.7 million to construct the memorial was narrowly approved by Newtown voters in April 2021, and site work began in August 2021. Construction was completed in August 2022. The memorial opened to the public on November 13, 2022, after a private ceremony with the victims' families. It features a stone basin engraved with the names of the victims, with a young sycamore tree at its center. A memorial mass is held every year at St. Rose of Lima Church.

== See also ==
- Chenpeng Village Primary School stabbing, a school stabbing on the same day which drew comparisons between the two attacks

=== Lists ===
- List of attacks related to primary schools
- List of school-related attacks
- List of school shootings in the United States by death toll
- List of school shootings in the United States (2000–present)
- List of school massacres by death toll § Rampage killers
- List of disasters in the United States by death toll
