= Sandy Hook Memorial =

Connecticut memorial for the elementary-school shooting victims

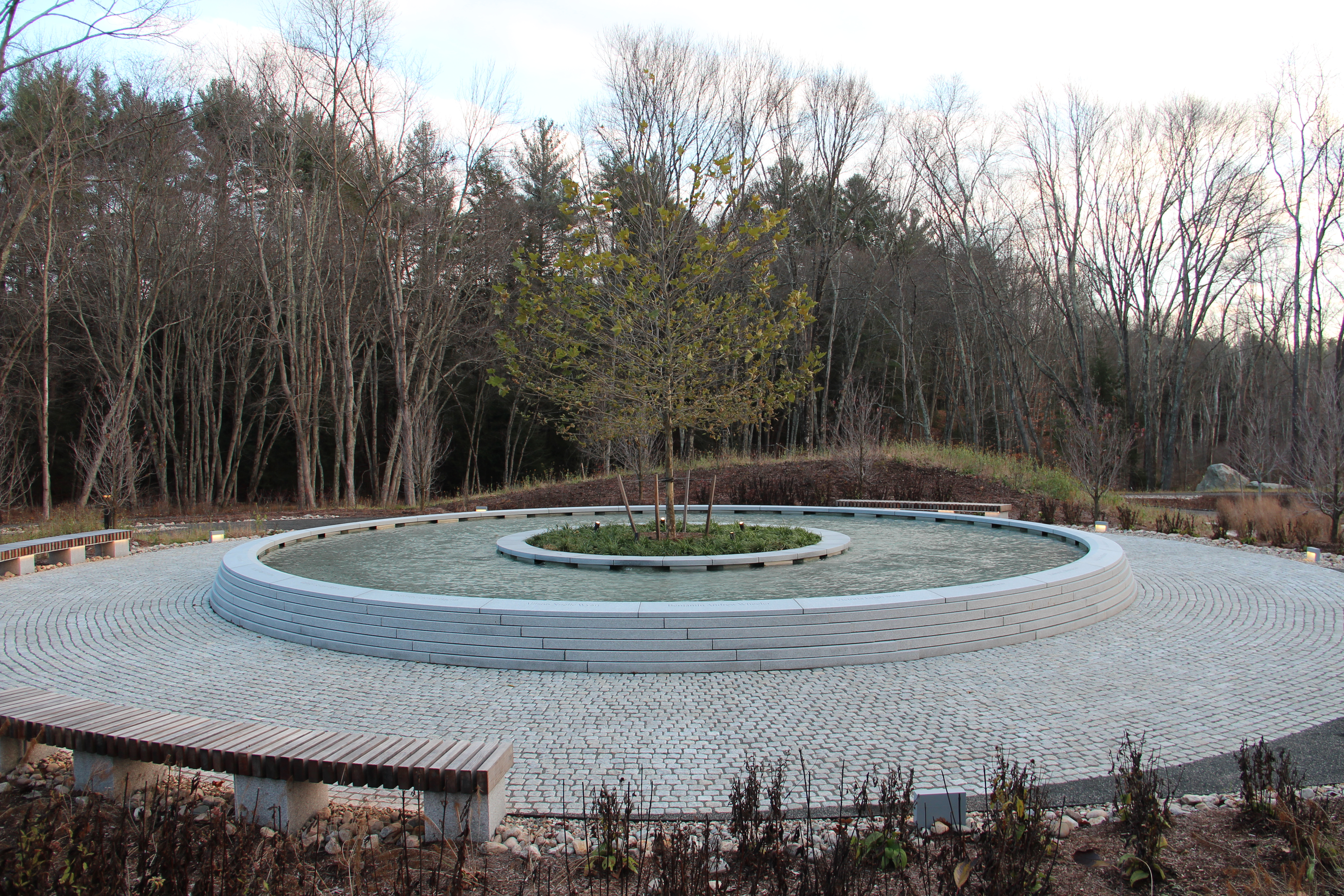
- The memorial basin at sunset

General information
- Status: Open
- Type: Memorial
- Coordinates: 41.4232°N 73.2758°W
- Construction started: August 2021
- Completed: August 2022
- Opening: November 13, 2022; 3 years ago (public)

Design and construction
- Architects: Dan Affleck and Ben Waldo

Website
- Sandy Hook Permanent Memorial Commission

The Sandy Hook Permanent Memorial is a memorial in Sandy Hook, Connecticut, that honors the twenty children and six educators who were victims of the Sandy Hook Elementary School shooting on the morning of December 14, 2012. The memorial is located at 32A Riverside Road in the woods adjacent to the reconstructed Sandy Hook Elementary School, built near the site of the original school that was razed.

Planning for a memorial began in 2013 when Newtown, Connecticut's board of selectmen appointed the Sandy Hook Permanent Memorial Commission. The five-acre (2.0 ha) site, donated by the Boys Social and Athletic Club of Sandy Hook, was chosen from among 17 potential properties after commission members heard children playing on the nearby school's playground during a site walk. The winning design, created by architects Dan Affleck and Ben Waldo of SWA Group, was selected from a pool of 189 submissions.

US$3.7 million (equivalent to $4.4M in 2025) to construct the memorial was narrowly approved by Newtown voters in April 2021, and site work began in August 2021. Construction was completed in August 2022. The memorial opened to the public on November 13, 2022, after a private ceremony with the victims' families.

== Background ==
On the morning of December 14, 2012, 20-year-old Adam Lanza shot and killed 26 people at Sandy Hook Elementary School. Twenty of the victims were children between six and seven years old, and the other six were adult staff members. Earlier that day, Lanza fatally shot his mother at their Newtown home. As first responders arrived at the school, Lanza committed suicide. The incident is the deadliest mass shooting at an elementary school in U.S. history, and the fourth-deadliest mass shooting overall. The shooting prompted renewed debate about gun control in the United States.

Several impromptu memorials were created in Newtown in the days following the tragedy.

== Design ==
=== Reflecting pool and sycamore tree ===
The main feature, a granite water basin engraved with the names of the victims, rests at the center of a circling network of gravel paths, stone seat walls, and cobblestone. A planter in the center of the basin features a young sycamore tree, symbolizing the young ages of the victims.

=== Visitor plaque ===
Near the path to enter the memorial, a plaque resting upon a stone welcomes visitors and includes a quote from the then-U.S. president, Barack Obama, when he spoke at an interfaith vigil at Newtown High School on December 16, 2012, two days after the tragedy.

Here in Newtown, I come to offer the love and prayers of a nation. I am very mindful that mere words cannot match the depths of your sorrow, nor can they heal your wounded hearts. I can only hope it helps for you to know that you’re not alone in your grief; that our world, too, has been torn apart; that all across this land of ours, we have wept with you.

Encased within the stone is soil created from items left in impromptu memorials throughout Newtown in the days following the tragedy.

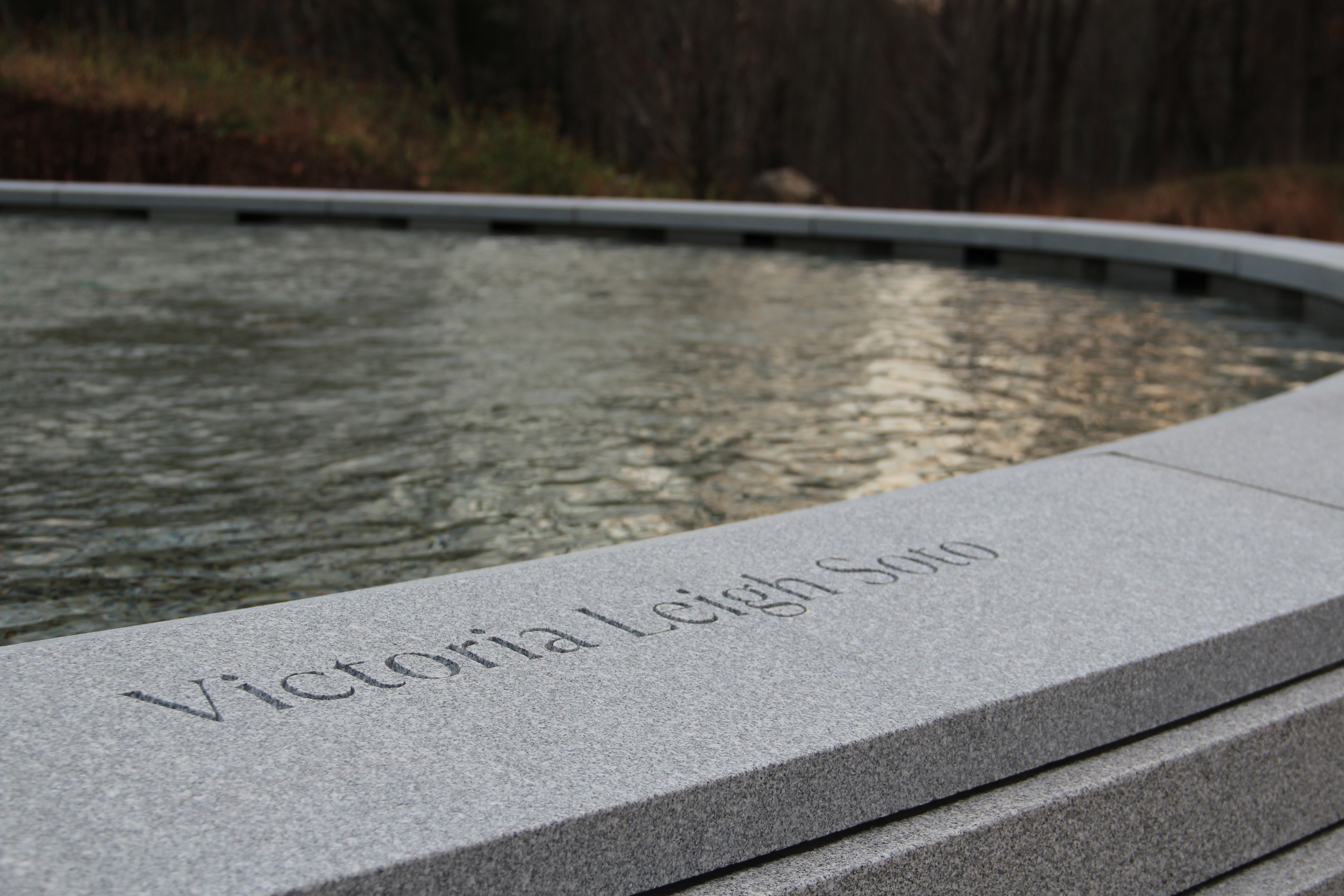
Engravings of the victims' names

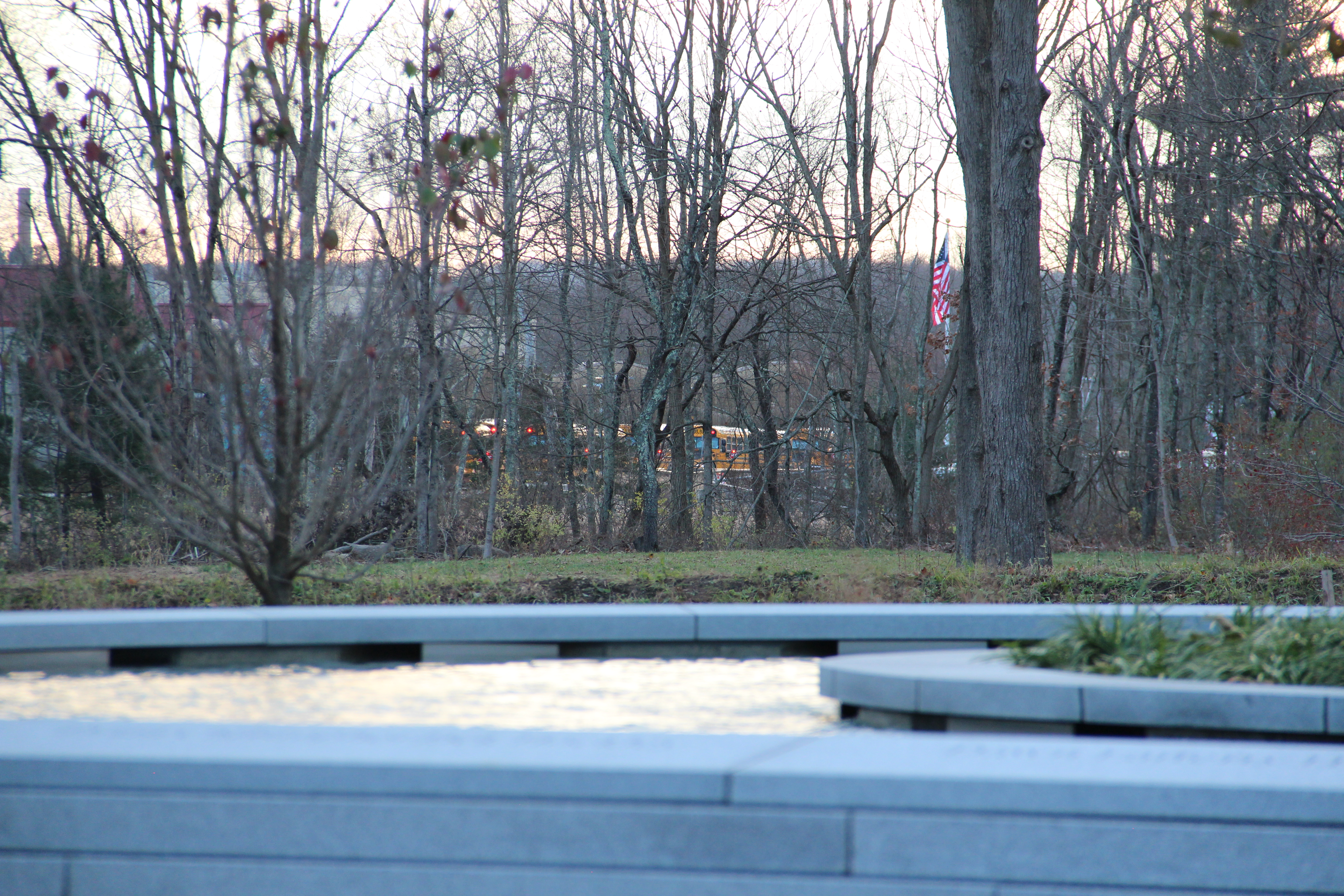
New Sandy Hook school

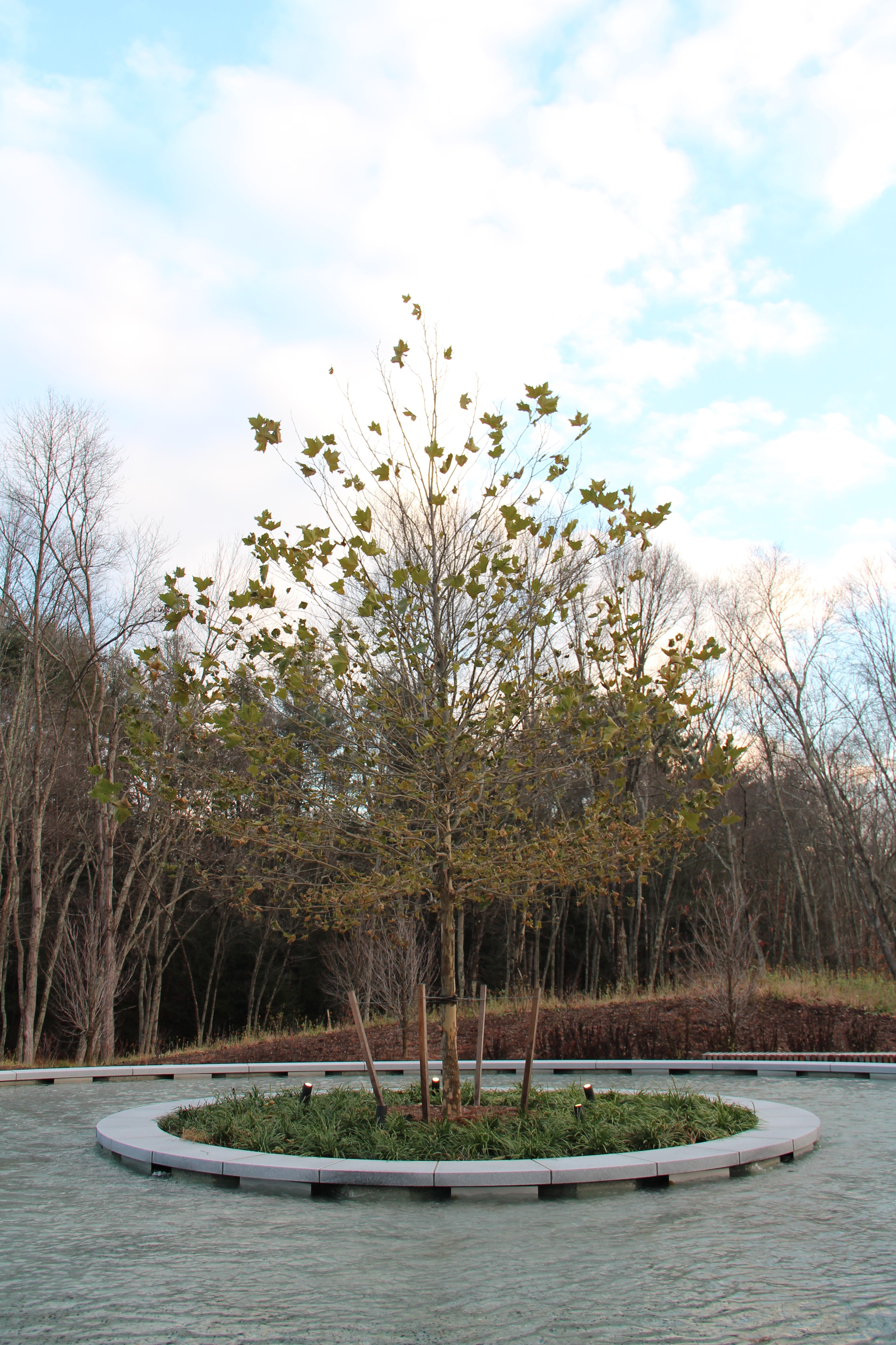
Sycamore tree in the basin

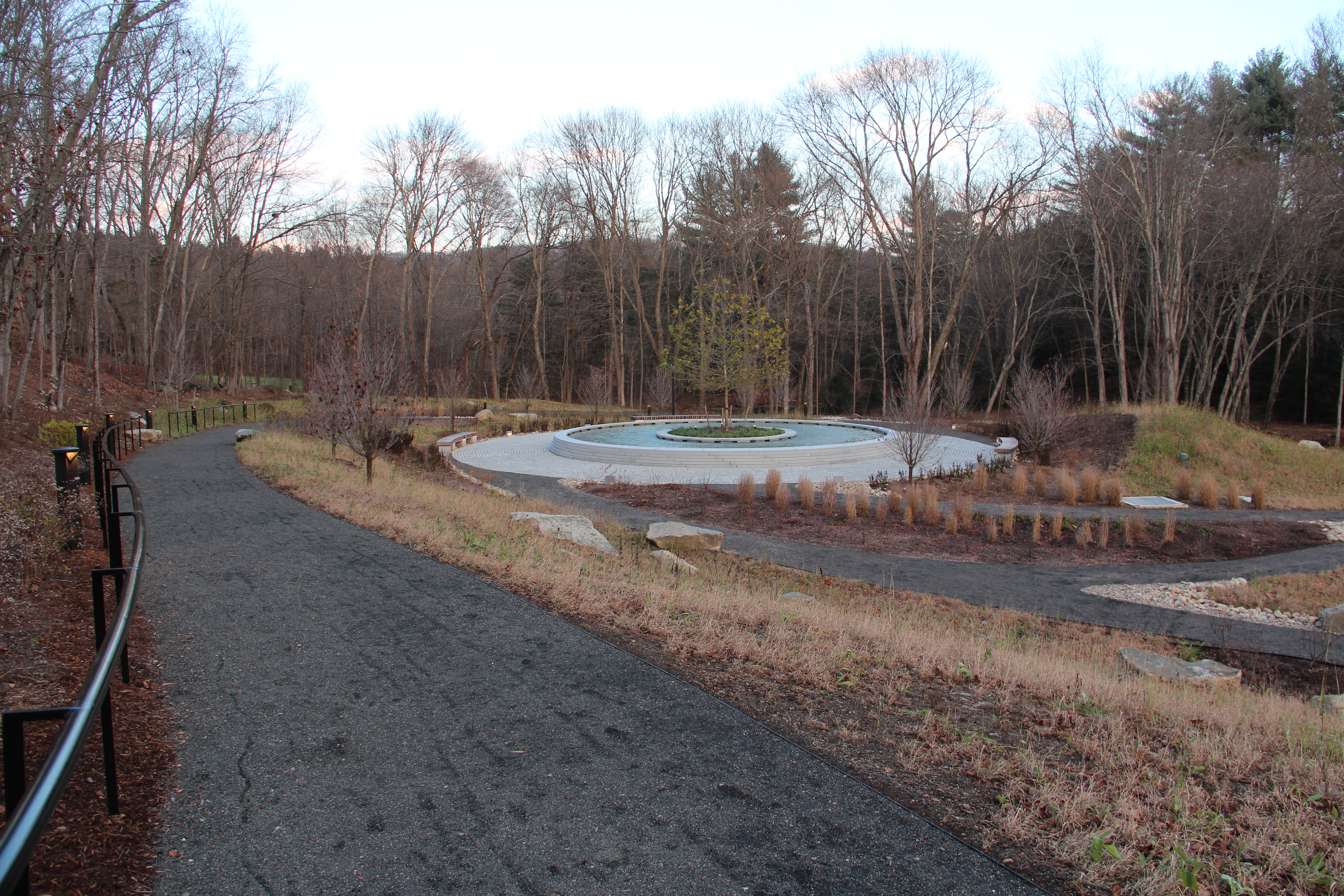
Path leading to the basin

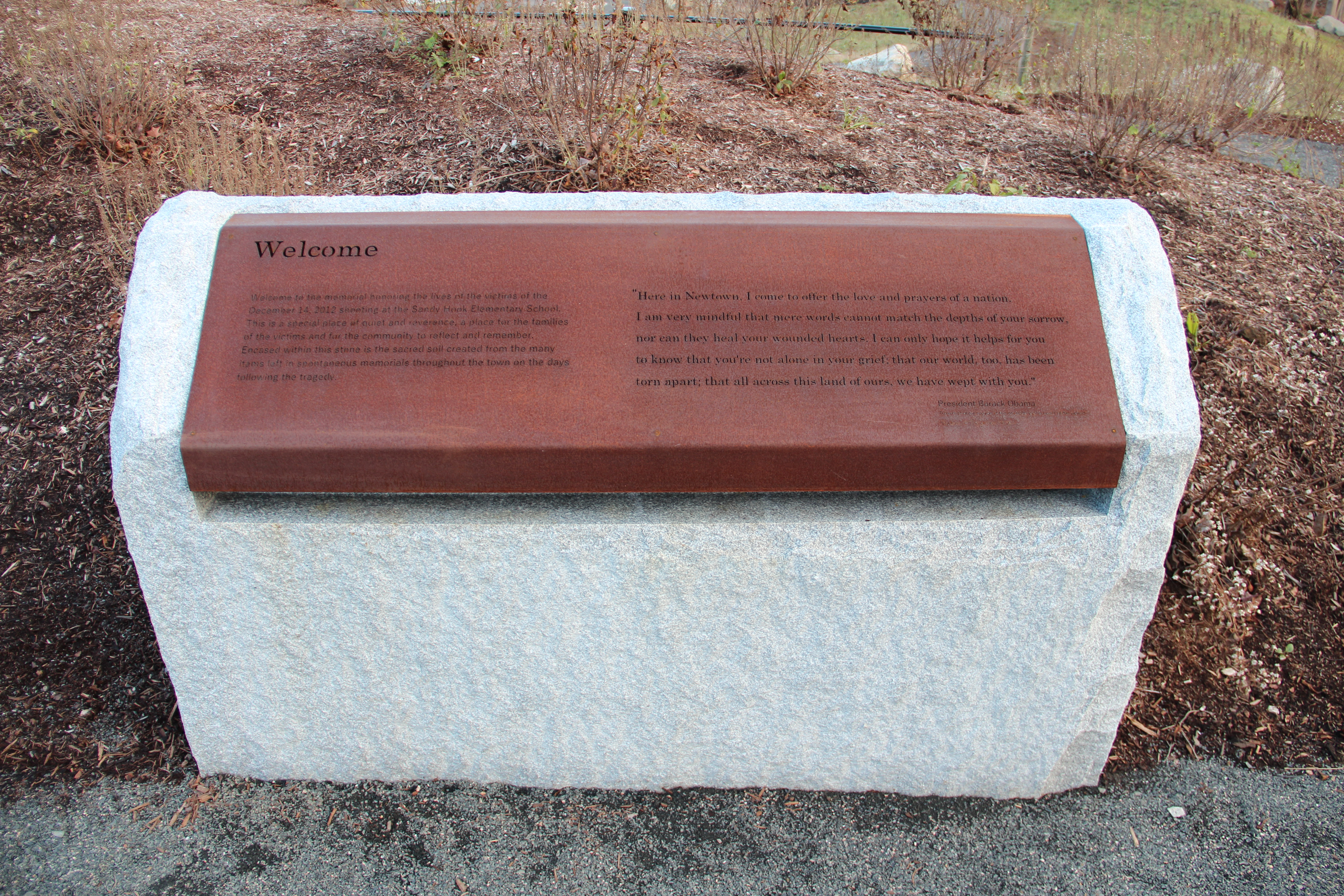
Visitor plaque near the entrance
