= Adam Lanza =

American mass murderer (1992–2012)

- Lanza at Newtown High School in 2008
- Born: Adam Peter Lanza; April 22, 1992; Exeter, New Hampshire, U.S.
- Died: December 14, 2012 (aged 20); Newtown, Connecticut, U.S.
- Cause of death: Suicide by gunshot
- Education: Sandy Hook Elementary School; Newtown Middle & High School; Western Connecticut State University; Norwalk Community College
- Occupations: Unemployed, former job at computer repair shop
- Known for: Perpetrator of the Sandy Hook Elementary School shooting
- Motive: Unknown

Details
- Date: December 14, 2012 c. 9:35 – 9:40 a.m.
- Targets: Students and staff at Sandy Hook Elementary School
- Killed: 27
- Injured: 2
- Weapons: .223 Remington Bushmaster XM-15-E2S semi-automatic rifle (Sole weapon used in the school shooting); 10mm Glock 20SF semi-automatic pistol (used to commit suicide); .22LR Savage Mark II bolt-action rifle (used to murder his mother at home)

Adam Peter Lanza (/lɑːnzɑː/) (April 22, 1992 – December 14, 2012) was an American mass murderer who perpetrated the Sandy Hook Elementary School shooting, one of the deadliest mass shootings and mass murders in American history. On December 14, 2012, he fatally shot his mother, Nancy Lanza, at their home in Newtown, Connecticut, before driving to Sandy Hook Elementary School, where he murdered 20 children aged six and seven, and six adult staff members. He then killed himself as law enforcement arrived at the school.

Lanza was born in Exeter, New Hampshire, and grew up in Newtown, Connecticut, where he was raised primarily by his mother following his parents' divorce in 2008. From an early age, he was diagnosed with several neurodevelopmental conditions, including Asperger syndrome, sensory processing disorder, and obsessive–compulsive disorder (OCD). He was described by those who knew him as highly intelligent but profoundly withdrawn. He struggled throughout his childhood and adolescence with social interaction and emotional regulation, and hated to be touched.

As a teenager, Lanza became increasingly isolated and had no close friends throughout middle and high school. His anxiety led to him being placed on homebound status in middle school, receiving instructions at home rather than attending classes. He recouped by high school and started attending classes again as well as socializing, applying for university and college classes for extra credit. He graduated high school early at 16. His mother declined treatments recommended by the Yale Child Study Center, preferring to accommodate his preferences rather than forcing him to adapt to social environments and improving his mental health. By 2010, Lanza withdrew from almost all social contact, cut off all contact with his father and brother, and became a recluse in his mother's home, using trash bags to black out the windows in his bedroom. By 2012, he refused to leave his room and communicated with his mother only through email. He developed an intense preoccupation with mass violence, compiling extensive research on prior shootings and discussing the topic with others via online forums and websites.

Lanza had access to an arsenal of legally purchased firearms belonging to his mother, an avid gun enthusiast, which he would use to carry out the murders. Severe mental illness, social isolation, and access to weapons were all identified as contributing factors to the shooting by Connecticut state authorities and the Office of the Child Advocate. The Sandy Hook shooting led to renewed legislative efforts on gun control at both the state and federal level. Nancy Lanza's role in facilitating her son's access to firearms became a significant point of public and legal scrutiny.

== Early life and education ==
=== Elementary and middle school years ===
Adam Peter Lanza was born on April 22, 1992, in Exeter, New Hampshire, the second son of Peter and Nancy Lanza (née Champion). Nancy experienced hypotension and hypoglycemia among other problems during the pregnancy, and gave birth to Adam via C-section due to decreased fetal movement. The Lanza family moved to Newtown, Connecticut, after Peter started a new job at General Electric in 1998. Reports say that when he was younger, he learned to shoot through the Cub Scouts. Lanza had a pet hamster named Skippy.

Lanza attended Sandy Hook Elementary School for four and a half years. Nancy's house was located five miles away from Sandy Hook Elementary School. His father, Peter, described him as a "normal little weird kid" who enjoyed playing with Legos and inventing board games. While teachers noted he was academically bright, he required an Individualized Education Program (IEP) for speech and social-emotional support from preschool onward. Within the local region, Sandy Hook Elementary School had a reputation for being accommodating to special needs students in the late 1990s.

Lanza's parents separated in 2002 with Peter living in an apartment in downtown Stamford, Connecticut while Nancy remained in the family home. When Adam was interviewed by a psychiatrist in 2006, he answered that his parents separated probably because they "irritated" each other just as they irritate him. Peter did not believe that his separation from Nancy negatively impacted their children. He spent as much time with his children after the separation as before it, since he worked full-time and only saw his children on weekends.

Lanza attended Reed Intermediate School for sixth grade in 2003. Lanza started attending Newtown Middle School in 2004. The transition to middle school—where he had to change classrooms and navigate noisy hallways—was physically and emotionally overwhelming for him. His mother reported that he experienced intense anxiety during this period. She told friends that her son started getting upset in middle school because of frequent classroom changes during the day. The movement and noise were too stimulating and made him anxious. At one point, his anxiety was so intense that she took him to the emergency room at Danbury Hospital.

In 2006, Lanza's mother noted some abnormal changes about her son's behavior around the seventh grade. He discontinued playing the saxophone, dropped out of a school band that he was previously in, and withdrew from playing soccer or baseball which he said he did not enjoy. Because of the smaller class sizes, his mother moved him to a parochial school, St. Rose of Lima, in April 2005. Lanza attended St. Rose of Lima for only eight weeks and left in June 2005. By eighth grade, his anxiety was so severe that he was placed on homebound status, receiving instruction at home rather than in a classroom.

At age 10, Lanza co-authored the Big Book of Granny, which contained graphic depictions of violence against children. In the seventh grade, Lanza wrote an essay which, according to his teacher's assessment, expressed "feelings of rage, hate and (at least unconscious) murderous impulses". It was reportedly too graphic and violent to be shared with the class, and the teacher asked Lanza to prepare an alternative piece; Lanza subsequently wrote and presented a poem.

=== High school and university years ===
Lanza attended Newtown High School, where he was active in a technology club, for which he once hosted a LAN party at his house where he played games with other students in the club. but remained socially isolated. Students and teachers who knew him in high school described Lanza as "intelligent but nervous and fidgety". He avoided attracting attention and was uncomfortable socializing. He was not known to have had any close friends in school. The intense anxiety Lanza experienced at the time suggests his autism might have been exacerbated by the hormonal shifts of adolescence. Lanza was named to the honor roll a few times, but there are no photos of him inside the high school yearbooks.

At age 16, while still a high school student, Lanza enrolled in classes at Western Connecticut State University and Norwalk Community College in 2008 and 2009, respectively, for extra credit for high school. At Western Connecticut, two classmates described him as nice, quiet (which was believed to be because of how much younger he was compared to everybody else) who would smile sometimes, participate upon being called on by the teacher, and who they would said hi to from time to time. He was once invited to a bar by two classmates but he declined stating that he was only 17. He maintained a 3.26 GPA on his college transcript, and a 3.89 GPA on his high school transcript. He earned an A in Visual Basic computer programming, an A− in website production, an A− in American history since 1877, a B in macroeconomics, and a C in Introduction to Ethical Theory, his lowest passing grade. However, he dropped out of several classes in these years which were Data Modelling, introductory German, which he reported to an aforementioned classmate that he had received a D in an exam before dropping out, computer science, and Database (DB) design. His mother eventually withdrew him from high school to finish his credits early through a mix of tutoring and independent study. He earned his high school diploma from Newtown High School at age 16 through a combination of tutoring, independent learning and college classes. The Office of the Child Advocate later concluded that his schools often focused on managing his symptoms rather than addressing the underlying social-emotional deficits.

For a while, Lanza worked as an independent contractor at a computer repair shop until it went out of business, as indicated in a written letter from his employer in March 2009. Lanza's employer described him as "cordial, professional" and having "expert attributes". Lanza had some interest in enlisting in the military when he was 18, but he never did. Lanza got his driver's license in 2010.

Lanza's parents divorced in September 2009 after Nancy filed for divorce in November 2008, citing "the marriage has broken down irretrievably". Observers and court documents described the split as relatively amicable, with no public disputes over property or parenting. Peter agreed to a substantial alimony arrangement that provided Nancy with nearly $290,000 annually by 2012. He also committed to paying for both sons' college and graduate educations. They shared joint legal custody of Adam, who was 17 at the time of the finalization, though he lived primarily with Nancy. The agreement gave Nancy the final decision-making power if they could not agree on issues regarding Lanza, as she always had.

=== Relationships with his mother and others ===
Nancy became a housewife mother shortly after Adam was born. He had access to the guns used in the shooting through his mother, who was described as a "gun enthusiast who owned at least a dozen firearms". She often took her two sons to a local shooting range, where they learned to shoot. Lanza's father, Peter, has said that he does not believe Nancy feared Adam. She did not confide any fear of him to her sister or to her best friend, slept with her bedroom door unlocked, and kept guns in the house. Adam struggled with showing basic emotions and would be coached by his mother when he was young. Adam was involved in a school play during his childhood, his mother had written to a friend "Adam has taken it very seriously, even practicing facial expressions in the mirror!" The state's attorney report on the shooting states that when Nancy asked Adam whether he would feel sad if anything happened to her, he replied "No." After her divorce, Nancy would take vacations to leave Adam alone in the house for days at a time, hoping that it would make Adam become more independent. She went to fine restaurants, slept in hotels, was in Boston on a regular basis, and occasionally flew to England, New Orleans, and San Francisco. Before each trip, she left prepared meals in the refrigerator for Adam to eat. In 2010, Lanza became a complete recluse. He lived in his mother's home, where he used black trash bags to black out the windows of his bedroom. He communicated with his mother, Nancy, almost exclusively via email, despite living together. In the final months, he often refused to leave his room or engage with her at all.

He abruptly cut off all contact with his father, Peter, in 2010 and was estranged from his older brother, Ryan. The no contact with his father may have been due to heated disagreement over whether Lanza could handle a full load of courses at Norwalk Community College. Lanza never had an intimate relationship with anyone, nor did he ever voluntarily hug anyone. Lanza believed that if he ever had children, he would be a "phenomenal father", since he would raise them to be freethinkers and respect their independence.

== Mental health issues ==
Lanza exhibited developmental challenges before the age of three. Early evaluations found "significant delay in social-personal development" and difficulty in being understood by others. By preschool, he was diagnosed with sensory processing disorder, which made typical sights, sounds, and touch physically overwhelming for him. Sensory-processing disorder does not have official status in the medical community as a formal diagnosis, but is a common characteristic of autism. Lanza was seen by the New Hampshire Birth to Three intervention program and referred to special education preschool services.

Lanza had communication difficulties, socialization delays, and repetitive behaviors. Lanza did not speak until he was three years old. He frequently washed his hands and changed his socks 20 times a day, to the point where his mother did three loads of laundry a day. He also sometimes went through a box of tissues in a day because he could not touch a doorknob with his bare hand.

When he was 13, Lanza was diagnosed with Asperger's syndrome by psychiatrist Paul Fox. Lanza exhibited extreme shyness and social awkwardness. His anxiety affected his ability to attend school and in 8th grade he was placed on "homebound" status, which is reserved for children who are too disabled, even with supports and accommodations, to attend school. When he was 14, his parents took him to Yale University's Child Study Center, where he was diagnosed with obsessive–compulsive disorder (OCD), depression and anxiety.

Lanza received treatment from Robert King, who advised implementing comprehensive support, and Kathleen Koenig, a colleague at the Yale Child Study Center, prescribed citalopram, an antidepressant. Lanza took the medication for three days. His mother Nancy reported: "On the third morning he complained of dizziness. By that afternoon he was disoriented, his speech was disjointed, he couldn't even figure out how to open his cereal box. He was sweating profusely ... it was actually dripping off his hands. He said he couldn't think ... He was practically vegetative." He never took the medication again. A report from the Office of the Child Advocate found that "Yale's recommendations for extensive special education supports, ongoing expert consultation, and rigorous therapeutic supports embedded into (Lanza's) daily life went largely unheeded."

Lanza appears to have had no contact with mental health providers after 2006. The report from the Office of the Child Advocate stated: "In the course of Lanza's entire life, minimal mental health evaluation and treatment (in relation to his apparent need) was obtained. Of the couple of providers that saw him, only one—the Yale Child Study Center—seemed to appreciate the gravity of (his) presentation, his need for extensive mental health and special education supports, and the critical need for medication to ease his obsessive–compulsive symptoms." Lanza received no psychiatric treatment or medication after 2008, despite being impaired by anxiety and obsessive–compulsive disorder (OCD). On a college admissions questionnaire, Lanza answered that he had no "documented disabling condition" and he declined to identify his gender.

In interviews conducted in 2013, Peter Lanza speculated that his son's Asperger syndrome might have masked an undiagnosed condition such as schizophrenia. He said that the Asperger diagnosis may have led the family to interpret Adam's increasingly unusual behavior and isolation as expected features of the syndrome rather than something else was wrong. Peter F. Langman has also suggested that Lanza may have had undiagnosed schizophrenia, as he experienced a seemingly psychotic episode in 2010. Lanza also showed symptoms consistent with schizophrenia, including blunted affect, alogia, anhedonia, sensory sensitivities, and decreased nociception. Because of concerns that published accounts of Lanza's autism could result in a backlash against others with the condition, autism advocates campaigned to clarify that autism is a brain-related developmental disorder rather than a mental illness. Those advocates argued that the aggression displayed by Lanza in the shooting is not typically observed in the autistic population and none of the psychiatrists he consulted identified concerning indications of violence in his demeanor.

At the time of his death, Lanza "was anorexic (he was six feet tall (183 cm) and weighed 112 pounds (51 kg)), to the point of malnutrition and resultant brain damage." Medical experts believe this severe malnutrition caused cognitive impairment and brain damage. In November 2014, a report from the Office of the Child Advocate in Connecticut stated that "Anorexia may lead to cognitive impairment, and the combination of anorexia with an autism spectrum disorder and OCD likely heightened Lanza's risk of suicide." According to medical records, Lanza was vegan since he was 13 years old and disdained the mouthfeel of some foods.

== Later life ==
=== Interest in pedophilia ===
At some point, Lanza wrote a 34-page college application essay on his computer where he argued that consensual pedophilia is not abhorrent, nor should it be illegal. The essay argued that modern attitudes towards pedophilia are arbitrarily constructed and children can consent to sexual activity with adults. State investigators described the computer file as "advocating pedophiles' rights and the liberation of children". The essay had an obsessive, academic tone.

According to Federal Bureau of Investigation (FBI) documents, Lanza also wrote an outline for a screenplay titled Lovebound which describes a relationship between a 30-year-old man and a 10-year-old boy and views that child-adult relationships could be beneficial. On an online forum, Lanza wrote that he did not believe there should be an age of consent.

The Sandy Hook Advisory Commission concluded in 2014 that there was not enough information to determine whether Lanza was a victim of a pedophile. In 2016, Lanza's ex-psychiatrist, Paul Fox, was arrested and charged with sexual assault on a former patient. In a document that was later released to the public in 2018, Lanza wrote that he was molested "at least a dozen times" by doctors during genital exams with his parents' knowledge. On reflecting on these alleged activities, Lanza opined: "I don't see how I and every child was not raped by doctors: We did not consent to it. We only did it because our parents made us".

In two personal messages with friends, Lanza argued that there is nothing wrong with pedophilia. In the same messages, Lanza affirmed that he is not a pedophile and that he never had sexual activity with children nor desired it. Lanza told his friend that pedophilia is "a disease that needed to be treated and not looked at as evil". In some emails, Lanza described pedophiles as a "threat" that could "influence a child". According to the Connecticut Office of the Child Advocate, there is no evidence nor records that Lanza had pedophiliac tendencies. The FBI concluded in 2014 that there is no evidence that Lanza ever acted on his academic interest in pedophilia.

=== Online isolation and activities ===
Lanza's online activity was a primary focus for investigators, as it provided the only real window into his deteriorating mental state and his obsession with mass murder. In his final years, he lived in near-complete isolation within his room, dedicating his time to browsing the Internet and playing World of Warcraft and other video games. The Office of the Child Advocate report states that he "descended" into a world where his only communication with the outside world was with members of a cyber-community, "a small community of individuals that shared his dark and obsessive interest in mass murder".

Lanza never permitted others to access his bedroom, not even his own mother. Lanza had also taped black plastic garbage bags over the windows in his bedroom in order to block out sunlight. He had cut off contact with both his father and brother in the two years before the shooting. At one point, he communicated with his mother only by email, despite living in the same house together. When Hurricane Sandy struck the Northeastern U.S. in October 2012, the Lanza home was without electricity for days and Lanza was scared. Nancy Lanza suggested going to a hotel, but Adam refused to leave the house, so they both stayed home. A document titled "Selfish", describing Lanza's belief in the inherent selfishness of women, was found on his computer after his death. Lanza had two Tumblr accounts, "gayfortimk" and "queerforkimveer", named after school shooters Tim Kretschmer and Kimveer Gill. Lanza glorified previous school shooters on his Tumblr accounts and deleted his posts in November 2012.

In early 2016, officials confirmed that a 25-second video of a man playing Dance Dance Revolution was Lanza. In Connecticut's final report on Lanza, it was stated that he was obsessed with the game and would play at a Connecticut theater for up to 10 hours a day every weekend. If a stranger tried to join him for a two-player game, he would walk away from the arcade machine. Lanza would occasionally play the game at the theater up to a month before the shootings.

Lanza had an unnamed friend with whom he would have wide-ranging conversations about various topics, including computers, chimpanzee behavior, mental health, human nature, morality, prejudice, Lanza's family, and mass murderers. The unnamed witness met Lanza sometime in 2011. They sometimes played Dance Dance Revolution, watched horror movies, and went hiking together. He reported in police interviews that Lanza "was capable of laughing, smiling, and making jokes, though always in a dry fashion". The friend stated that in general, Lanza would adopt "a very nihilist take on things" and seemed "overtly fatalistic and bleak". In June 2012, Lanza had a falling out with his friend and they stopped spending time together.

=== Obsession with mass shootings ===
Investigation findings revealed Lanza had a keen interest in mass shootings, such as the Columbine High School massacre. He made a spreadsheet with detailed information on mass shooters and mass shooting incidents, along with making Tumblr accounts named after school shooters.

Lanza edited several Wikipedia entries on mass killings and mass murderers from 2009 to 2010. Most of his edits pertained to adding information on the weaponry used by mass murderers. He used "Kaynbred" as his username on Wikipedia.

In his room, investigators uncovered clippings, including a story from The New York Times detailing an incident in 1891 where a man shot at school children. His computer contained two videos of gunshot suicides, movies that showed school shootings, and two pictures of Lanza pointing guns at his own head. Records show that Nancy planned on gifting Adam a CZ 83 pistol for Christmas in 2012.

Lanza was a member of what is now commonly referred to as the True Crime Community. Lanza had an account on a forum titled "Super Columbine Massacre RPG", which discusses the video game of the same name and other mass shootings. Lanza used the username "Smiggles". Investigators saw Lanza's posts on Tumblr and the Super Columbine Massacre RPG! forum as a clear indicator about Lanza's fascination with Columbine and other mass shooting incidents. In one post on the forum, Lanza describes having a dream about Columbine while he was asleep. In another, he wrote: "I'm still waiting for a mass shooter who eschews 9mm pistols and instead buys an AK-47 pistol, 30 30-round magazines, and 1000 hollow points". In late 2011, Lanza sympathized with Dylan Klebold and described Eric Harris as "a monster".

Lanza had posted writings related to the 2011 Norway attacks perpetrated by Anders Behring Breivik, citing his mass murder as "impressive", and writing that he "finally outdid Woo Bum-kon", referring to how South Korean policeman Woo's spree killing had been the deadliest mass shooting to date when Breivik's attacks occurred. He also contrasted Breivik to American-Israeli mass murderer Baruch Goldstein. On the Columbine forum, Lanza wrote "Serial killers are lame. Everyone knows that mass murderers are the cool kids".

Federal Bureau of Investigation (FBI) documents released in 2017 revealed that a man warned the Newtown Police Department in 2008—four years before the massacre—that Lanza was planning to kill his mother and children at Sandy Hook Elementary School. Authorities discovered a massive, 7-by-4-foot (2.1-by-1.2 m) spreadsheet on his computer that documented hundreds of mass murders dating back to the 1700s. It contained 17 categories, including weapon types, casualty counts, and the death of the perpetrator. Some investigators believe he was studying these cases to maximize his own lethality or to compete for a high ranking on his own list. He reportedly told an online contact in July 2012 that he only had a perfunctory interest in mass murderers and no longer cared about anything. Lanza did not have a criminal record before the shooting.

Data recovered from a portable GPS shows that Lanza was in the vicinity of the Sandy Hook Elementary School a day prior to the shooting. Reports say that he owned a portable GPS device.

== Sandy Hook Elementary School shooting ==
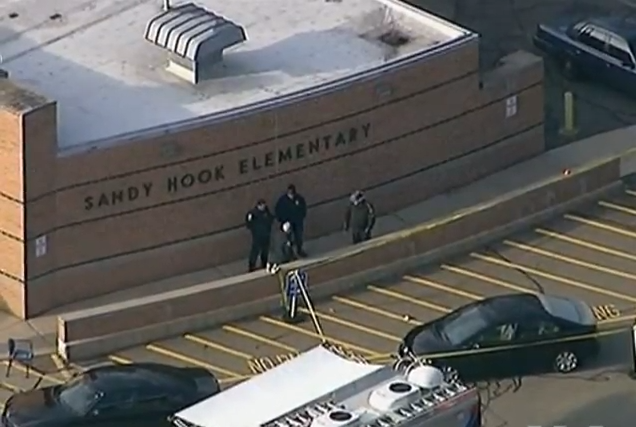
Police arriving at Sandy Hook Elementary after the shooting

On the morning of December 14, 2012, prior to the shooting, Lanza removed the hard drive from his computer and intentionally destroyed it with a hammer or screwdriver, making it difficult for investigators to recover its data. Sometime before 9:30 a.m. EST, Lanza fatally shot his mother Nancy, with a .22-caliber Savage Mark II rifle at their Newtown home. Investigators later found her body in her bed, clad in pajamas, with four gunshot wounds to her head. Lanza then drove to Sandy Hook Elementary School in his mother's car. Shortly after 9:35 a.m., armed with his mother's Bushmaster XM15-E2S rifle and ten magazines with 30 rounds each, Lanza shot his way through a glass panel next to the school's locked front entrance doors. Some of those present heard the initial shots on the school intercom system, which was being used for morning announcements.

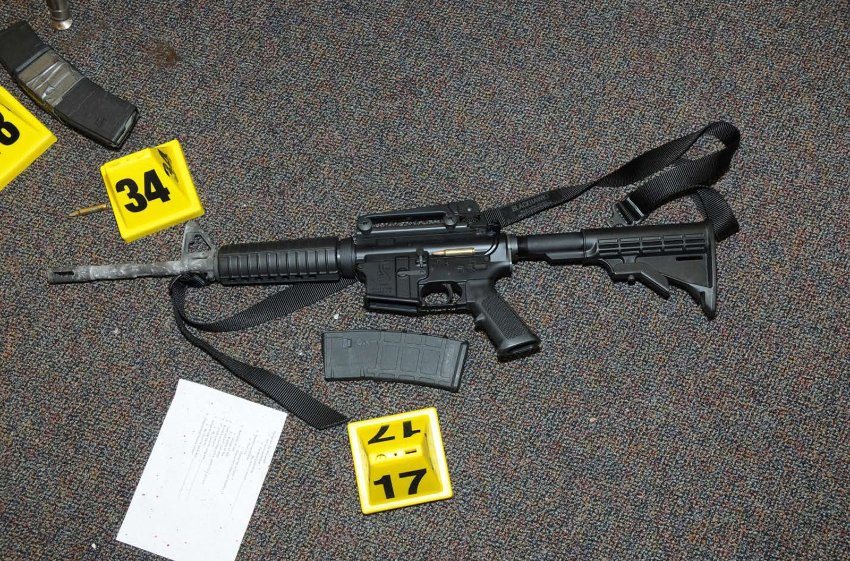
The perpetrator's AR-15 found in classroom 10 after the shooting

The police heard the final shot at 9:40:03 a.m. They believed that it was Lanza shooting himself in the lower rear portion of his head with the Glock 20SF in a classroom he had previously opened fire in. Lanza's body was found wearing a pale green pocket vest over a black polo shirt over a black T-shirt, along with black sneakers, black fingerless gloves, black socks, and a black canvas belt. Other objects found in the vicinity of Lanza included a black boonie hat and thin frame sunglasses. The Glock was found, apparently jammed, near Lanza, and the rifle was found several feet away from him. A 9mm SIG Sauer P226, which had not been fired during the incident, was also found on Lanza.

Lanza shot all but two of his victims multiple times. Most of the shooting took place in two first-grade classrooms near the entrance of the school. The students among the victims totaled eight boys and twelve girls, all either six or seven years old, and the six adults were all women who worked at the school. Eighteen children were pronounced dead at the school and two were pronounced dead at Danbury Hospital. As of the present day, the Sandy Hook Elementary School shooting is the second deadliest school shooting in U.S. history.

=== Possible motives for shooting ===
While official investigations concluded that Lanza's motive may never be known, they identified several events and psychological factors that likely contributed to his decision. In messages to a fellow gamer, he wrote, "I incessantly have nothing other than scorn for humanity". Counseling psychologist Peter F. Langman has suggested that Lanza suffered from narcissism and solipsism, a state where he perceived other people as "cardboard cut-outs" without real value, which removed any moral constraint against killing them. However, the FBI found no evidence that Lanza believed his attack to be a video game or game.

While Lanza had Asperger's syndrome, obsessive–compulsive disorder (OCD), and severe anxiety, commentators emphasize these did not cause the violence. However, his mental health was completely untreated after 2008, leading to a "deteriorating life of dysfunction". By the time of the attack, he was severely anorexic, which medical experts believe caused cognitive impairment and may have contributed to a possible psychotic break or a "loss of touch with reality". A report by the Office of the Child Advocate concluded that "combined with access to deadly weapons, this proved a recipe for mass murder". James Knoll, a forensic psychiatrist at SUNY Upstate Medical University, was consulted about what motivated Lanza to kill. Knoll states that Lanza's final act conveyed a distinct message: "I carry profound hurt—I'll go ballistic and transfer it onto you."

According to the Hartford Courant, there are no school records nor testimonies that Lanza was ever bullied. According to the USA Today, there are mixed anecdotes on whether Lanza was bullied or not. According to the New York Daily News, a relative of the Lanza family claimed that Lanza was taunted and beaten by other students while he attended Sandy Hook Elementary School. Amy McKinnon, the mother of one of Lanza's classmates, also alleges that Lanza was hit and teased. Lanza never told his parents about any bullying. Adam's relative alleged that Nancy Lanza would come to the school with Adam each day because she believed that the school staff were failing to protect him. Nancy reputedly considered suing the school. Peter Lanza testified that Adam was bullied due to his lack of social skills and his physical gait, but not excessively. One of Lanza's friends during his late life in 2011 and 2012 said that Lanza never revealed being bullied in school.

One theory suggests Lanza may have targeted the school because of an extreme anxiety-driven resistance to leaving his childhood home and familiar environment. The FBI identified Lanza's waning relationship with his mother as a considerable stressor and hardship in his life. Nancy Lanza's desire to sell the house where she and Adam lived may have been a partial motive for the shooting, as it would have required evicting Adam from his bedroom. In the weeks leading up to the shooting, Lanza's mother contemplated moving with Adam to either Washington or North Carolina. Nancy planned to purchase a recreational vehicle for Adam to stay in so that potential purchasers could see the house without disturbing him. The Report of the Child Advocate stated that:

In the wake of Mrs Lanza's stated plan to move out of Newtown in 2012, and perhaps stimulated by fears of leaving the "comfort zone" of his home, Adam planned and executed the massacre at Sandy Hook Elementary School on December 14, 2012.

An online acquaintance told the Federal Bureau of Investigation (FBI) that Lanza felt pity for children, believing they were being improperly controlled by parents and teachers. She suspected Lanza may have viewed the killings as a way of saving or protecting them. According to the acquaintance, Lanza wrote that he liked the Harry Potter series, especially how "at the age of 11, the kids were taken away from their families".

Suicide could have been a primary motive. Langman wrote that "Lanza was profoundly unhappy about being alive". In a computer document, Lanza once wrote "killing yourself would intuitively be moral because you would not have the capacity to commit immoral deeds, which you innately do through being alive; and yet many would somehow forbid suicide as being immoral".

== Attacks and plots inspired by Lanza ==
On September 13, 2024, Nicholas Prosper murdered his mother, brother and sister at their flat in Luton, England with an illegally purchased shotgun. He turned himself into police the same day. Whilst in custody, Prosper confessed that he had planned to commit a school shooting at his former primary school. According to the Judges sentencing remarks, Prosper "explicitly sought to emulate and outdo" Lanza in this shooting.

Guy Edward Bartkus, the perpetrator of the 2025 Palm Springs fertility clinic bombing, was partially inspired by Lanza's alleged writings to commit an attack.

Robin Westman, the perpetrator of the 2025 Annunciation Catholic Church shooting that killed 2 children and wounded 28 others, had a deep fascination with Lanza and wrote his name on a magazine, though it is unclear if it was one of the magazines used in the shooting.

In January 2026, two female students at Lake Brantley High School were arrested for an alleged plot to murder their classmate in a "blood ritual" to resurrect Lanza.

On April 15, 2026, a 16-year-old boy allegedly set fire to and wrote “RIP Adam Lanza” in graffiti on a storage shed at an elementary school in Bethesda, Maryland. The suspect's social media account indicated he was involved in the True Crime Community.
