= St. Rose of Lima Church (Newtown, Connecticut) =

Coordinates: 41°24′55.74″N 73°17′58.08″W

- St. Rose of Lima, Newtown, Connecticut
- St. Rose of Lima Church
- Location: 46 Church Hill Road; Newtown, Connecticut
- Country: United States
- Denomination: Roman Catholic
- Website: www.strosechurch.com

History
- Founded: 1859

Administration
- Province: Hartford
- Diocese: Bridgeport
- Parish: Saint Rose of Lima

Clergy
- Archbishop: Henry Joseph Mansell
- Bishop: Frank J. Caggiano
- Vicar(s): The Rev. Eric Silva and The Rev. Anh Vu
- Pastor(s): The Rev. Peter Cipriani, Pastor 2024-

St. Rose of Lima Church is a Roman Catholic parish church at 46 Church Hill Road in Newtown, Connecticut, United States. It is under the authority of the Diocese of Bridgeport, and was founded under the patronage of St. Rose of Lima, the first person born in the Americas to be canonized by the Catholic Church.

== History ==
The first Catholics to reside in Newtown arrived involuntarily. They were four Acadians billeted on the town in 1756 by the General Assembly. No further information is known regarding them. From late June to early July 1781, Count Rochambeau encamped at Newtown and it is presumed the French chaplains celebrated Mass for the troops. In 1858, Rev. John Smith purchased a Universalist meeting-house to conduct services for a congregation of about 100.

The parish was founded in 1859, the first in that region of the county, originally serving 11 towns in the northern part. The first resident pastor was Rev. Francis Lenihan. Before his appointment, Newtown was served by priests from Danbury. During the tenure of pastor James McCarten, a church was erected in 1882. Rev. P. Fox established the parish school in 1896; it was staffed by the sisters of Mercy.

The modern Colonial Revival-style church dates from the early 1960s.

== School ==
St. Rose of Lima Catholic School, located at 40 Church Hill Road, provides education to children in preschool through eighth grade. In 2009, the school won the Blue Ribbon Award.

== Relation to Sandy Hook shooting ==
On December 14, 2012, a 20-year-old man, Adam Lanza, fatally shot his mother in their home before killing 26 people at Sandy Hook Elementary School in a school shooting which gained international attention. The dead included twenty children and six members of the school staff. Lanza attended St. Rose of Lima for eight weeks from April to June 2005.

That evening, a candle-light vigil was held at St. Rose Church, at which various religious leaders of the town and the Governor of Connecticut, Dan Malloy, addressed the assembled crowd. The parish offered a special Mass that same evening and the church remained open throughout the night, in order to provide a place of comfort for the people of the town.

On Sunday, December 16, around noon, someone called the parish office and said, “I’m going to kill everyone there. My friend didn’t finish the job”. Parish officials tried to keep the caller on the line, asking him to repeat himself. He did so, making the same threat in the same words. Churchgoers quickly evacuated church. Police in SWAT gear arrived at the church to check out the area.

Funerals for 11 of the children killed in the shooting were held at St. Rose Church.
