= Josh Koskoff =

American lawyer

- Born: Connecticut
- Education: Syracuse University (BA); Suffolk University Law School (JD)
- Occupation: Lawyer
- Organization(s): Lawyer, Koskoff Koskoff & Bieder
- Relatives: Theodore I. Koskoff (grandfather)
- Awards: Time 100 2025

Josh Koskoff is an American attorney. A third-generation lawyer, he is best known for his work representing families of the victims of the Sandy Hook Elementary School shooting and the Uvalde school shooting. He was named to the Time 100 in 2025.

== Biography ==
Koskoff was raised in Connecticut. Both his father and grandfather were attorneys with Koskoff, Koskoff & Bieder, and he has recounted eating breakfast provided by his grandfather's client and mobster Frank Piccolo and being babysat by another client who was a member of the Black Panthers.

He attended the Syracuse University before earning his JD at Suffolk University Law School.

He is best known for representing the families of victims of the Sandy Hook Elementary School shooting in their lawsuit against Remington Arms. He became involved in the Sandy Hook case after meeting a friend of one of the victims. The case resulted in a 73 million dollar settlement, the largest payout by a gun manufacturer in a mass shooting case. He also represented families against Alex Jones in regards to the Sandy Hook case.

He has also filed suit against Harvard University for the daguerrotypes of Renty Taylor and his daughter, Delia, which the university ultimately agreed to release. He represented the families of Uvalde school shooting victims in a lawsuit against Meta, Activision, and Daniel Defense, and in a lawsuit against the city of Uvalde, Texas which ended in a settlement. He also represented women who alleged the Yale University reproductive clinic provided them saline instead of painkillers. This also ended in a settlement.

He filed an amicus brief in support of law firms during the Targeting of law firms and lawyers under the second Trump administration. He has also discussed similarities between the Sandy Hook shooting and the 2022 Buffalo shooting.

His role in the Sandy Hook shooting lawsuit is set to appear in a TV series about the case.

He was named to the Time 100 in 2025: his profile was written by U.S. Senator Chris Murphy.
