= No contact =

Communication practice

No contact, or low contact, is a practice in which one individual intentionally cuts ties with or estranges themselves from another individual, leading to minimized or a complete lack of communication. The term is generally applied to familial contexts, in which a relative is cut off, as well as romantic contexts, where two ex-partners cease speaking to one another following a breakup.

== History ==
According to Teen Vogue, The New Yorker, and other publications, discourse around "no contact" has risen in the 2020s and specifically as a result of Generation Z and the LGBTQ community, which has used social media platforms as a way to discuss "no contact" with family members and exes. Publications like The Cut have reported a rise of "no contact" content on platforms like TikTok from 2024 and onward.

Dazed stated that the term "no contact" in a familial context has increased through the 2020s, such as the r/EstrangedAdultKids subreddit which grew by 47% in weekly visitor count from 2024 to 2025. New York Post, in a 2026 critical piece against "no contact culture," cited a YouGov survey finding that 38% of the American population is estranged from a close relative, with 16% having cut off one or both parents.

Experts, such as psychologist Sam Barcham, found that familial "estrangement is no longer quite as taboo as it used to be" in the 2020s due to shifting cultural norms around "unquestioned family obligation" and "more emphasis placed on autonomy, emotional wellbeing, and individual fulfilment." Barcham, however, cautioned against the idea that no contact was a purely Gen Z concept "driven by TikTok pop psychology."

== Contexts ==
=== Family ===
"No contact" has often been used in a familial context wherein a family member reduces or eliminates communication with another relative. Reasons for no contact in a familial context vary from religious differences, to political disagreements, to lack of acceptance over queer identity, among other reasons. A BuzzFeed survey found that family members initiated no contact due to violent incidents, lack of accountability, addiction problems, disapproval of partners, complicity in abuse, and many other irreconcilable issues.

=== Romance ===
The term "no contact" can also be used to refer to the lack of communication between two ex-partners after a breakup, usually if friendship isn't a possible alternative framework following one, or "if the situation is abusive, emotionally or physically." Elle referred to it as a "heartbreak survival tactic" and a "clean emotional detox" in which an individual deliberately phases out their ex from their lives.

A 2026 survey by the Matchmaking Company, polling over 2,300 individuals, found that 66% of them still talked to their exes, with 28% of Gen Z individuals staying in touch with "most or all" of their exes.

=== Celebrities ===
The term "no contact" has also been used to describe celebrity news such as Prince Harry's "minimal contact with his father and brother since his 2020 exodus from the royal family," as well as Brooklyn Beckham's decision to "cut off his mother and father."
