= Savage Mark II =

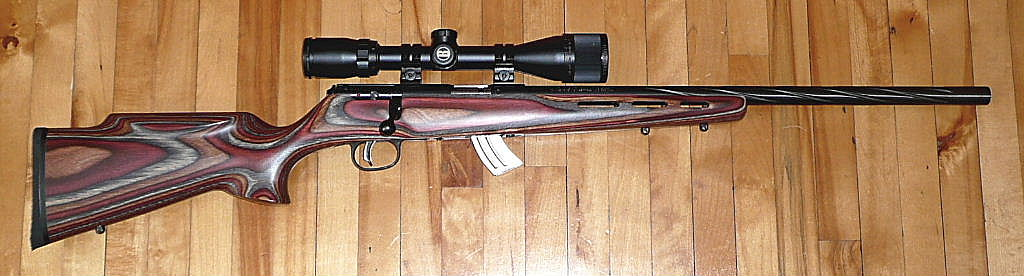
- Savage Mark ll BRJ .22lr with Bushnell scope
- Type: Bolt action rifle
- Place of origin: Canada

Production history
- Manufacturer: Savage Arms

Specifications
- Mass: 5.5lbs (2.5kgs)
- Barrel length: 21" (53.34cm)
- Cartridge: .22 LR .17 HM2
- Action: Bolt action
- Feed system: 5 or 10 round magazines, higher capacity magazines available

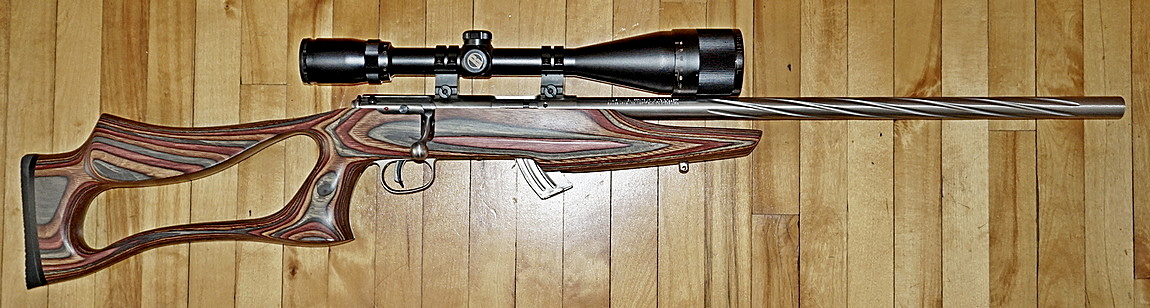
Savage Mark II BSEV

The Savage Mark II is a line of bolt-action rimfire rifles made by Savage Arms that are mainly intended for target practice, small game hunting, and recreational shooting.

== History ==
Established in Lakefield, Ontario, in 1969, Lakefield Arms gained recognition for manufacturing rifles, especially the Lakefield Model 64 and Mark II.

In 1995, Savage Arms acquired Lakefield Arms, including its designs and manufacturing capabilities. This acquisition allowed Savage to incorporate established rimfire designs into its product lineup.

The Lakefield Mark II rifles continued to be manufactured under Savage's name.

== Variants ==
The Mark II comes in several variants:

- Mark I: Single shot model
- Mark II F: Basic model featuring a synthetic stock
- Mark II G: Similar to the F but with a wooden stock
- Mark II TR: Target shooting oriented model with a heavy barrel to be optimized for competitive shooting.
- Mark II BSEV: Features a bull barrel and an adjustable stock
- Mark II BRJ: Multi colored wood stock and spiral fluted barrel.
- Mark II FV: Chambered for .17 HM2

== See also ==
- Ruger 10/22
