= Sandy Hook Elementary School shooting conspiracy theories =

Claims regarding the 2012 mass shooting

The Sandy Hook Elementary School shooting occurred on December 14, 2012, in Newtown, Connecticut. The perpetrator, Adam Lanza, fatally shot his mother before murdering 20 students and six staff members at Sandy Hook Elementary School, and later committed suicide. A number of fringe figures have promoted conspiracy theories that doubt or dispute what occurred at Sandy Hook. Various conspiracy theorists have claimed, for example, that the massacre was actually orchestrated by the U.S. government as part of an elaborate plot to promote stricter gun control laws.

The more common conspiracy theory, adopted initially by James Fetzer, James Tracy, and others, and further popularized by Alex Jones, denied that the massacre actually occurred, asserting that it was faked. The massacre was described by Fetzer and Tracy as a classified training exercise involving members of federal and local law enforcement, the news media, and crisis actors, which they claim was modeled on Operation Closed Campus, an Iowa school-shooting drill that was canceled in 2011 amid threats and public outcry. Jones described the shooting incident as "synthetic, completely fake with actors; in my view, manufactured [...] it just shows how bold they are that they clearly used actors."

No evidence supports the conspiracy theories, which make a number of implausible claims. Moreover, many Sandy Hook conspiracy theories contradict one another. A number of sources have published articles debunking various claims put forward by conspiracy theorists. In 2018, the parents of several children killed in the Sandy Hook shooting launched a lawsuit against Jones and other authors of conspiracy videos for defamation, accusing them of engaging in a campaign of "false, cruel, and dangerous assertions". In 2019, Jones reversed his stance and stated that the massacre was real.

== Conspiracy claims ==
=== United States government involvement ===
Some conspiracy theorists claim that the shooting was a hoax and a false flag operation staged by the United States government. Others say the attack is being used by politicians to push through new gun control legislation, or to otherwise persecute gun owners.

Lawyer and dentist Orly Taitz—best known for her promotion of Barack Obama citizenship ("birther") conspiracy theories—was quoted as asking "Was Adam Lanza drugged and hypnotized by his handlers to make him into a killing machine as an excuse as the regime is itching to take all means of self defense from the populace before the economic collapse?"

Talk show host Clyde Lewis wrote: "Don't you find it at all interesting that Adam Lanza, the alleged shooter at Sandy Hook, woke up one day and decided to shoot up a school and kill children at about the same time that Barack Obama told the U.N. that he would sign the small arms treaty?"

According to Live Science, "No one, regardless of what side of the gun control issue they are on, can deny that guns played a key role in the Sandy Hook killings. So the conspiracy theorists must instead challenge the claim that the attack even occurred. They believe it's all a hoax to scare people into supporting more gun control and a step toward an outright repeal of the Second Amendment." They also found that the vast majority of evidence used by conspiracy theorists to support the concept that Sandy Hook was a hoax is contradictory. Snopes.com also debunked several claims of alleged United States government involvement in the shootings.

==== Operation Closed Campus ====
Fetzer, Tracy, and others have claimed the shooting was a classified training exercise modeled on Operation Closed Campus, a "full-spectrum" school-shooting drill involving the Department of Homeland Security, Iowa emergency-management agencies, state and local police, prosecuting attorneys, emergency radio operators, emergency medical personnel, moulage, local doctors and hospitals, the Red Cross, medical examiners, news media reporters, and crisis actors that was canceled in 2011 amid threats and public outcry.

=== Claims broadcast by Iranian television ===
Press TV, the official state media outlet of Iran, has promoted various antisemitic conspiracy theories blaming "Israeli death squads" for the shooting. Press TV interviewed Veterans Today website writer Gordon Duff, who quoted Michael Harris, a former Republican candidate for governor of Arizona, who made the "Israeli death squads" claim. Harris has publicly associated with neo-Nazi groups in the past and has previously claimed that Israel was responsible for the 2011 Norway attacks. Duff asserted that the attacks were an act of "revenge" for the perceived cooling of Israel–United States relations under President Obama, especially as a response to Obama's decision to nominate former senator Chuck Hagel, a perceived critic of Israel, for the position of United States Secretary of Defense. In another broadcast by Press TV, Holocaust denier James H. Fetzer claimed that the massacre "appears to have been a psy op intended to strike fear in the hearts of Americans" that was conducted by "agents of Israel."

The Washington Post reported that claims broadcast on Press TV contain a large number of "obvious logical fallacies" typical of Iranian propaganda, which "has a well-earned reputation for incendiary anti-Israel stories and for wild conspiracy theories." The Atlantic wrote that the story "obviously plays on the worst fears of those who believe in secret Jewish cabals that run the world, but it's a pretty pathetic attempt at slander, even for Iran."

=== Additional conspirators ===
Ben Swann, a Cincinnati news anchor for Fox affiliate WXIX-TV, has suggested on his personal YouTube channel that Adam Lanza was accompanied by another shooter; he has made similar claims about the Aurora shooting and the Wisconsin Sikh temple shooting from earlier in 2012. Other conspiracy theorists have claimed that as many as four shooters were present.

There is no credible evidence that any additional shooters were present at the event. Some such reports may have been influenced by confused early news reports of the events.

=== Relationship to LIBOR scandal ===
Other conspiracy theories have focused on the claim that Adam Lanza's father was an executive with GE Energy Financial Services. According to these theories, Lanza's father was supposed to testify before the Senate Banking Committee with information about the Libor scandal. However, no such hearings were scheduled. Similar claims had been made about the father of James Holmes, the convicted perpetrator of the 2012 Aurora, Colorado shooting.

=== Timestamps of memorial sites ===
Conspiracy theories have claimed that various timestamps for creation dates, whois records, and Google caches of various memorial websites, fundraising sites, and Facebook were created before or immediately after the date and time of the shooting and are therefore "evidence" of a conspiracy or cover up. However, timestamps are frequently incorrect, particularly on search engines. Some timestamps are initially created and assigned to URLs that are then repurposed, meaning that a URL linked to a current event can have a much older date.

=== Alex Jones claims ===
In September 2014, conspiracy theorist Alex Jones, who runs the website InfoWars, which had previously claimed that the murders were a "false flag" attack perpetrated by the government, made a new conspiracy claim that "no one died" at Sandy Hook Elementary School because the Uniform Crime Reports showed no murders in Newtown for 2012, and that the victims were "child actors." This claim is false and misrepresents the FBI report. In reality, because the Connecticut State Police was the lead investigator after the attack, the Sandy Hook victims were included in Connecticut's statewide records (under "State Police Misc.") rather than under the Newtown statistics.

In November 2016, Erica L. Lafferty, daughter of Dawn Lafferty Hochsprung, the school principal who was shot and killed at Sandy Hook School, wrote open letters to then-President-elect Donald Trump (published in Medium and USA Today), calling upon him to denounce Jones, after Trump had appeared on InfoWars during his presidential campaign and lavished praise on its presenter, saying that the conspiracy theorist had an "amazing" reputation and pledging not to let him down. On February 20, 2017, the Newtown School Board wrote to President Trump and urged him to recognize the murders of 26 people at Sandy Hook and to "remove your support from anyone who continues to insist that the tragedy was staged or not real." Trump did not respond to the letter.

On April 16, 2018, parents of two victims of the shooting sued Jones in Travis County, Texas (where Jones' media company is based), for $1 million each. The trial was expected to be scheduled by the end of 2020.

On May 23, 2018, six families of victims of the shooting, as well as an FBI agent who responded to the attack, filed a defamation lawsuit in Bridgeport Superior Court in Connecticut against Jones for his role in spreading conspiracy theories about the shooting.

In a deposition in the last week of March 2019, Jones acknowledged the deaths were real, stating he had "almost like a form of psychosis", where he "basically thought everything was staged."

By 2021, Jones did not provide information to support his claims, defaulting in favor of the plaintiffs.

=== James Tracy ===
James Tracy (b. 1965), is a former tenured professor of communication at Florida Atlantic University (FAU) at Boca Raton.

FAU president Mary Jane Saunders issued a statement that Tracy's views on the Sandy Hook shooting were "not shared by" the university. In response to his comments, the university opened an investigation of Tracy, who had tenure. Tracy holds a PhD degree, awarded by the University of Iowa in 2002.

In December 2015, after the family of Noah Pozner—one of the children murdered at Sandy Hook—claimed that Tracy had harassed them, FAU moved to fire Tracy. Chan Lowe of the Sun-Sentinel speculated that the comments were a publicity stunt by Tracy. Tracy later declined an appearance on CNN with Anderson Cooper, suggesting that Cooper wanted to bring him and his family members harm by identifying him in a prior broadcast. The university fired Tracy on January 5, 2016, citing his refusal to file required paperwork related to outside employment for several years.

Tracy demanded that Leonard Pozner, the father of Sandy Hook victim Noah Pozner, provide proof of his son's death. As a result, FAU initiated a procedure to dismiss Tracy, who had tenure, in December 2015. He was dismissed in January 2016, although a statement from his former employer asserted that Tracy was fired for repeatedly neglecting or refusing to file standard paperwork disclosing activities or employment outside his job that might pose conflicts of interest. On April 25, 2016, he filed suit for wrongful termination. On December 12, 2017, Tracy's termination was upheld by a jury.

==== Appeals against dismissal ====
In 2018, civil rights attorneys for Tracy filed an appeal to the U.S. Court of Appeals for the Eleventh Circuit. In November 2020, Tracy lost the appeal, with the Tampa Bay Times reporting, "The opinion said Tracy argued that 'no reasonable juror could have found that his blog speech did not motivate the university to fire him,' but it concluded that he 'cherry-picks' the evidence and that he was fired for insubordination related to not filing reports about his outside activities." Tracy then appealed to the United States Supreme Court, but in December of 2021 the Court declined his appeal without comment.

=== James Fetzer ===
In 2016, James Fetzer and Mike Palacek published the book Nobody Died at Sandy Hook, which claimed that the event was a classified Federal Emergency Management Agency drill involving federal and local law enforcement and the media, and that the government had created false death certificates to claim there were victims. Fetzer stated that the parents displayed old photos of their real children and made up new names for the photo subjects, thereby creating non-existent younger siblings. Fetzer also claimed that several of these older-age real children, who were unnamed and billed as "Newtown's Children," sang "America the Beautiful" at the 2013 Super Bowl with Jennifer Hudson, arguing there were strong facial similarities with the victims. Lenny Pozner, father of victim Noah Pozner, filed a defamation lawsuit against Fetzer and Palacek. Pozner won a summary judgement from the court in June 2019. The book's publisher, Moon Rock Books, apologized to the Pozner family and agreed to take the book out of circulation at the end of June. In October 2019, a Wisconsin court ordered Fetzer to pay Pozner $450,000 for defamation; the court later added a $650,000 contempt sanction, for a total of about $1.1 million. A video similarly questioning official accounts of the shooting received several million views on YouTube within a week of its posting, although the video has since been modified to display a disclaimer explaining that its creators "in no way claim this shooting never took place, or that people did not lose their lives."

=== Other conspiracy theorists and claims ===
Other sources have continued to claim that the entire event was a hoax. On September 12, 2014, during a political debate, Colorado Republican Party candidate Tom Ready (who was running for Pueblo County Commission) was accused by his opponent, Sal Pace, of posting an article on his Facebook page claiming the Sandy Hook shootings "never happened". Ready responded: "Well, there is some question of whether it happened, Sal." This was followed by more statements of the same tenor, prompting outraged yells from the audience. After allegedly receiving a death threat the next day, Ready reportedly apologized for his remarks.

Other conspiracy theorists have tried to connect the shooting to references in popular culture. Prison Planet, a website owned by British conspiracy theorist Paul Joseph Watson, mentioned that Newtown-based author Suzanne Collins wrote The Hunger Games books, in which 23 children are "ritualistically" killed, while 20 children were killed in the shooting. Some conspiracy theorists have referred to this as "predictive programming". Others pointed out that "Sandy Hook" can be seen on a map of Gotham City in the 2012 Batman film The Dark Knight Rises—the New Jersey peninsula just south of New York Harbor is named Sandy Hook.

Several conspiracy theorists have also claimed a six-year-old victim of the shooting subsequently appeared in a photograph with President Barack Obama. In fact, the child in the photograph is actually the victim's sister, wearing her deceased sister's dress.

== Analysis ==
Writing about the Sandy Hook conspiracy theories, Benjamin Radford argued that most conspiracy theorists who allege contradictions in official accounts ignore contradictions in their own accounts, citing research from the University of Kent that conspiracy theorists selectively focus on or ignore particular details in order to fit their preferred narrative. The conspiracy theories have also been called evidence of "the need for a national debate on mental illness."

The debunking website Snopes ran an editorial debunking the "Sandy Hook Exposed" video, explaining how many of the theories make little sense, and answered many questions conspiracy theorists wanted answers to.

== Harassment by conspiracy theorists ==
Gene Rosen, a Newtown resident who was reported to have sheltered six Sandy Hook students and a bus driver in his home during the shooting, has been subject to harassment online alleging he was complicit in a government coverup, among other things. Some journalists have cited such incidents as part of a "Sandy Hook Truther Movement" analogous to the 9/11 Truth movement. A writer for the Calgary Herald reported that the movement self-identifies as "Operation Terror."

In May 2014, Andrew David Truelove stole a memorial sign from playgrounds dedicated to victims Grace McDonnell and Chase Kowalski. He then went on to call the parents of Grace McDonnell, proclaiming that he stole the sign and that he believed their deaths were a "hoax". He was arrested on May 30, and the signs were found in his home. Truelove was convicted of the theft and sentenced to one year in prison.

After doing a CNN interview on the day after the shooting, Robbie Parker, the father of victim Emilie Parker, became the target of conspiracy theorists, who claimed the interview was staged. Parker has been attacked by theorists who believe he is a "crisis actor" and was "getting into character" before going on CNN to grieve over the loss of his child.

In April 2016, Matthew Mills, a man from Brooklyn, accepted a plea agreement with prosecutors on one count of interfering with police arising from an incident in November 2015, when Mills angrily approached the sister of murdered teacher Victoria Soto—who is regarded as a heroine for her attempt to protect her students from the shooter in the Sandy Hook attack—shoved a photograph in her face, "and began angrily charging that not only did the Sandy Hook tragedy not take place, but that Victoria Soto never existed." Mills entered an Alford plea and was thus found guilty; he was given a suspended sentence of one year in jail and two years' probation.

In December 2016, Lucy Richards, a woman from Tampa, was charged with four counts of transmitting threats in interstate commerce for sending death threats to Leonard Pozner, whose son Noah was the youngest of 20 children murdered. Pozner has been particularly targeted by Internet trolls and conspiracy theorists because he has vocally fought back against them. Richards had been expected to plead guilty to one count of transmitting threats, with both the prosecution and defense to recommend a sentence of probation and house arrest. However, in March 2017, Richards—who was free on bond—failed to show up to court for a change-of-plea hearing and sentencing. An arrest warrant was issued, Richards' bond was revoked, and she was soon apprehended. On June 7, 2017, Richards was sentenced to five months' imprisonment.

Leonard Pozner founded an organization called the HONR Network, which takes legal action against harassers of Sandy Hook survivors and families.

Wolfgang Halbig, a past contributor to InfoWars, was arrested in January 2020 for unauthorized possession of personal information of Leonard Pozner. Halbig had illegally obtained Pozner's private information and attempted to dox Pozner by sending those to a long list of recipients. Under Florida law, unauthorized possession of such information carries a maximum prison term of one year.

== See also ==
- Gun politics in the United States
- List of conspiracy theories
- Reactions to the Sandy Hook Elementary School shooting
