= Sabrosky =

Sabrosky is a family name. It probably originates from people of the town of Sabrow (Zabierzów). Three towns in Poland hold this name.

== Notable people with this family name ==
- Alan Sabrosky, American security analyst and writer
- Curtis Williams Sabrosky (1910–1997), American entomologist
