= Jerome Sally =

American football player (born 1959)

No. 78, 76, 70
- Position: Nose tackle

Personal information
- Born: February 24, 1959 (age 67); Chicago, Illinois, U.S.
- Listed height: 6 ft 3 in (1.91 m)
- Listed weight: 267 lb (121 kg)

Career information
- High school: Maywood (IL) Proviso East
- College: Missouri
- NFL draft: 1982: undrafted

Career history
- New Orleans Saints (1982)*; New York Giants (1982–1986); Indianapolis Colts (1987); Kansas City Chiefs (1988)
- * Offseason or practice squad member only

Awards and highlights
- Super Bowl champion (XXI); Missouri Tigers Hall of Fame, 2006

Career NFL statistics
- Sacks: 19.5
- Fumble recoveries: 2
- Stats at Pro Football Reference

Jerome Eli Sally (born February 24, 1959) is an American coach, educator, and former professional football player who played nose tackle for seven seasons for the New York Giants, Indianapolis Colts, and Kansas City Chiefs.

== Early life and college ==
Sally played football at Proviso East High School and attended the University of Missouri from 1978 to 1981. He was a standout defensive lineman who helped anchor Tiger defenses that keyed Mizzou to four consecutive bowl games from 1978 to 1981, lettering three years (1979–1981). During that time, MU had a combined record of 23–13, including two bowl game victories.

After retiring from football, Sally earned a Master of Education from William Woods University.

== Professional career ==
Sally played for the New York Giants from 1982 to 1986, where he had 7 1/2 QB sacks in 1985 and eventually won a Super Bowl ring as part of the 1986 World Championship team. He also played in the NFL for the Indianapolis Colts and Kansas City Chiefs before his retirement in 1988.

After retiring from professional football, Sally worked as the defensive coordinator at Hickman High School from 1991 to 1996 and as the school's strength and fitness coach from 1991 to 2006. At one point during Sally's coaching career, future host of the "Knowledge Fight" podcast, Dan Friesen, dropped Sally's Super Bowl ring and was made to run laps as punishment.

He was elected to the University of Missouri Hall of Fame in 2006, and the Proviso East Sports Hall of Fame in 2014.

Since 2015, Sally has worked as an assistant principal at Hickman High School in Columbia, Missouri. In 2018, Sally sued Columbia Public Schools for alleged race and age discrimination, claiming that he had been paid less than his white colleagues.
