= HONR Network =

American nonprofit organization founded in 2014 by Lenny Pozner

- Formation: 2014; 12 years ago
- Founder: Lenny Pozner
- Legal status: 501(c)(3) nonprofit organization
- Headquarters: Orlando, Florida, U.S.
- Website: www.honrnetwork.org

HONR Network is an advocacy organization focused on combating online harassment, misinformation, and digital abuse. The organization has received investigative media coverage for its public voice in discussions around conspiracy-driven harassment and accountability in online activism. Its efforts have led to significant policy changes at Facebook, WordPress, YouTube and other major online platforms to protect victims of harassment.

== Notability ==
HONR Network has been profiled in investigative media, including CBS 60 Minutes and NPR, and has been referenced in published books examining misinformation-related activism and harassment movements.

== Founding ==
On Friday, December 14, 2012, Lenny Pozner's six-year-old-son Noah became the youngest victim of the Sandy Hook massacre when a lone gunman entered the school

in Newtown, Connecticut and opened fire, killing twenty grade one children and six educators before shooting himself dead.

Almost immediately after the shooting, conspiracy theorists began claiming that the event was staged by the US government in order to generate sympathy and justification for a drastic ban on guns and a weakening of the Second Amendment. They claimed that no one died at Sandy Hook Elementary and that the families of victims and first responders were crisis actors. As the youngest victim, Noah's photo was frequently used by the media when reporting on the aftermath. Stories on conspiracy theorist's websites, such as Infowars, began claiming that Noah either never existed, or that he was an actor, alive and well, participating in other "false flag" incidents. Because of the news coverage, and the use of Noah's picture globally, conspiracy theorists began focusing on the Pozner family and defacing pictures of Noah that the family had placed on an online memorial page. Less than a month after the shooting, Noah's mother, Veronique de la Rosa and her brother, attorney Alexis Haller spoke out in the media advocating gun control. The online harassment continued as the conspiracy theorists posted hateful, defamatory, harassing, and anti-Semitic comments, as well as claims that Noah didn't die or even existed.

Some of the harassment was incited by InfoWars host Alex Jones. Seven weeks after the shooting, Pozner emailed Jones and asked "Haven't we had our share of pain and suffering? All these accusations of government involvement, false flag terror, new world order, etc...I feel that your type of show created these hateful people and they need to be reeled in!" InfoWars staff denied that Jones was participating in what Pozner had called "Hoax Theory". In response, Jones told his audience of over 12 million viewers to rise up and "find out the truth".

Pozner attempted to appease the conspiracy theorists by talking with them online, as well as sharing photos of Noah, his birth certificate, school reports and death certificate. His attempts at engaging with these people were largely rejected. These "hoaxers", a term Pozner used to describe conspiracy theorists who believed that mass casualty events were government perpetrated hoaxes, began an intense campaign of harassment, that included stalking, death threats, posting a background report on him, his social security number, and the addresses of Pozner, and his family members, online on various social media platforms. These platforms had long ignored requests by victims of online harassment, merely suggesting that they "flag" or report instances of abuse, that would then be reviewed and potentially removed by platform moderators. A person could only flag a particular piece of content once, and most content that only received a single flag or even a handful of flags was never removed.

By 2014, Pozner had spent more than a year flagging content, and appealing to the social media platforms to remove thousands of defaced pictures of his son and Pozner's own private information, as well as reporting instances of harassment and death threats. Pozner was contacted by other victims of online harassment who were in similar situations and needed advice. He also was contacted by people interested in furthering his efforts, and Pozner organized volunteer to report posts and pictures en masse. He named the group the HONR Network. The name HONR is not an acronym, but instead is a repurposed web domain name he had owned previously as a professional web developer.

== Influence ==
HONR Network's advocacy led to policy changes at YouTube, Facebook, and WordPress, resulting in the removal of thousands of Sandy Hook denial videos, posts, and related content. (Bloomberg 2019; CNN 2019, Dutton p. 182)

== Mission ==
The HONR Network's initial aims were to protect survivors and the families of victim of mass casualty events like Sandy Hook, who were being harassed, defamed, tormented, threatened, and intimidated online by hoaxers and hate groups. By using a multitude of methods of reporting harassing content, HONR has become effective at removing online hate. HONR has also assisted social media platforms in creating policies designed to better protect victims of mass casualty and highly publicized, violent incidents. HONR's mission has further expanded to assist all victims of online hate and harassment, regardless of the source and motivations. The organization also works to provide education about online rights and responsibilities and assist social media platforms to craft impactful policy to make the internet a safer place.

== Activities ==
In 2017, it was reported that HONR network had 300 volunteers working to remove defamatory and harassing content from the internet. All states have anti-harassment laws, but not all states extend the laws to online harassment. HONR volunteers report harassment, including posts with unauthorized photos, to social media platforms and online service providers, often citing invasion of privacy, bullying, hate speech, and copyright infringement.

On July 25, 2018, Lenny Pozner and his former spouse Veronique de la Rosa published an open letter to Mark Zuckerberg in The Guardian that criticized Facebook's failures to protect victims of harassment on the platform. They called for Facebook to expand its groups of protected people to include survivors of mass violence and families of victims. Pozner said that for five years, Facebook had largely ignored his requests to remove defamatory content, only granting Pozner's request regarding a small number Noah under an unauthorized use of the photo of a minor or copyright violation rule. Following the letter, Facebook announced that it had taken steps to recognize victims of mass casualty events as a protected group.

=== Social media policy changes ===
In 2018, WordPress denied Pozner's request to remove copyrighted images from conspiracy theorist blogs. Following outcry, WordPress's parent company Automattic enacted a policy against the "malicious publication of unauthorized, identifying images of minors."

The HONR Network has also brought about significant change in policy at YouTube. In the past, the online video platform has had no policy against conspiracy or hoax theory videos in general. The HONR network continually raised its concerns about this lack of policy with YouTube. In response, in 2017, YouTube clarified that hoax theory videos that targeted the victims or family members of public acts of violence would count as harassment, and could be taken down. "Our hearts go out to the families who have suffered these incredibly tragic losses," a YouTube spokesperson said in an email. "We recognize the challenging issues raised by the victims' families, and that is why we updated the application of our harassment policy last summer. As a result, we have removed hundreds of these videos as they have been flagged to us and we will continue to do so."

In June 2019, YouTube announced that it would be further changing its official policy in order to combat hate speech. In an official blog post, it announced that it would prohibit and remove videos denying that well-documented, violent events like the Holocaust or the shooting at Sandy Hook Elementary, had taken place. Additionally, it would be removing hate and supremacist content. All told, this meant that hundreds of thousands of videos would now be considered to be in violation of its rules, and would be removed. Speaking about the change in policy, Pozner thanked YouTube for "taking the lead in enacting policy changes that we have been recommending for the past half-decade."

While most other major platforms have responded to requests for greater protection for survivors and the families of victims of mass casualty and high-profile violence, Twitter has continued to reject or ignore Pozner's and the HONR Network's appeals.

== See also ==
- Sandy Hook Elementary School shooting
- National Center for Victims of Crime
