= James Fetzer =

American academic, conspiracy theorist, and Holocaust denier

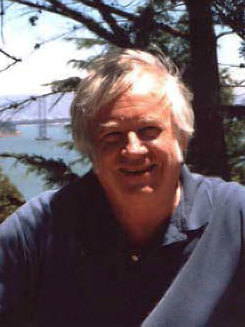
- Fetzer in 2004
- Born: James Henry Fetzer; December 6, 1940 (age 85); Pasadena, California, U.S.
- Years active: 1970–present

James Henry Fetzer (born December 6, 1940) is an American professor emeritus of the philosophy of science at the University of Minnesota Duluth, known for promoting conspiracy theories and Holocaust denial. Fetzer has worked on assessing and clarifying the forms and foundations of scientific explanation, probability in science, philosophy of mind, and philosophy of cognitive science, especially artificial intelligence and computer science.

Fetzer began to promote John F. Kennedy assassination conspiracy theories in the early 1990s. He later promoted 9/11 conspiracy theories, Holocaust denial, conspiracy theories regarding the 2002 death of Senator Paul Wellstone, and Sandy Hook Elementary School shooting conspiracy theories. He cofounded Scholars for 9/11 Truth in 2005, and claims that elements in the United States government, United States Intelligence Community, and Israeli Mossad were responsible for the September 11 attacks. Fetzer asserts that no commercial planes or hijackers were involved at any of the attack locations, that Flight 93 did not exist, and that guided missiles and/or explosives were instead used to destroy the buildings and create the appearance of a plane crash in Shanksville, Pennsylvania. Fetzer's allegations and speculations have drawn strong criticism as a source of disinformation and false conspiracy theories. In October 2019, a Wisconsin court ordered Fetzer to pay the father of a Sandy Hook victim $450,000 in a defamation case; the court later added a $650,000 contempt sanction, for a total of about $1.1 million.

Fetzer's views have been featured by Iran's PressTV, Fars, and Tasnim news agencies and the pro-Russian website Veterans Today, which have been described as sources of state propaganda. In an interview Fetzer supported Iranian and Russian media as "Press TV, along with RT and Sputnik News, have become the gold standard for reporting on international events and developments." He stated his opposition to the US and Israel as they "have become the greatest threats to freedom and democracy ever known, not only in the Middle East but throughout the world." He held up Iran as a "beacon of light in comparison to the United States." In another interview, Fetzer stated "Russia and Iran are now providing leadership for the world community. May they prosper and endure!"

== Early life ==
Fetzer was born in Pasadena, California, on December 6, 1940, to a father who worked as an accountant in a welfare office in Los Angeles County, and grew up in a neighboring city, Altadena.

After his parents' divorce, Fetzer moved to La Habra Heights, California, with his brother, mother, and stepfather. His mother took her own life when he was 11, and he went to live with his father and stepmother.

Following Fetzer's graduation from South Pasadena High School, he studied philosophy at Princeton University and graduated magna cum laude in 1962 where his undergraduate thesis, under the supervision of Carl G. Hempel, won The Dickinson Prize. He then joined the United States Marine Corps, and was second lieutenant in an artillery unit. In the early 1960s, he was stationed at Okinawa, Japan. During military service in the 1960s, Fetzer married, and divorced four years later, after having a son. He remarried in the 1970s.

In 1966, soon after promotion to captain, he resigned to enter graduate school. Having attained a master's degree from Indiana University, he studied at Columbia University for a year, then returned to Indiana University and in 1970 gained a PhD in history of science and philosophy of science.

== Career ==
He became an assistant professor at the University of Kentucky in 1970, and received the University of Kentucky Student Government's first Distinguished Teaching Award in 1973. He was denied tenure at Kentucky in 1977, and spent the next ten years in visiting positions at the University of Virginia, University of Cincinnati, University of North Carolina at Chapel Hill, and University of South Florida. After ten years without a tenure-track position, in 1987 he was hired as a full professor at the University of Minnesota Duluth. In 1996, Fetzer received a Distinguished McKnight University Professorship from the University of Minnesota, a title that recipients retain until they retire from the University. After Fetzer retired in 2006 he became professor emeritus.

In the late 1970s, Fetzer received a National Science Foundation fellowship, and contributed a chapter to a book on Hans Reichenbach. In 1990, Fetzer received the Medal of the University of Helsinki. He assisted theorists in computer science, and joined the debate over proper types of inference in computing. In the late 1990s, Fetzer was called to organize a symposium on philosophy of mind, and authored textbooks on cognitive science and artificial intelligence. He is an expert on philosopher Carl G. Hempel.

Fetzer published over 100 articles and 20 books on philosophy of science and philosophy of cognitive science, especially of artificial intelligence and computer science. In 2002, Fetzer edited Consciousness Evolving, a collection of studies on the past, the present, and the future of consciousness. He founded the international journal Minds and Machines, which he edited for 11 years, and founded the academic library Studies in Cognitive Systems, of which he was series editor. He founded the Society for Machines & Mentality. Near and after retirement, Fetzer remained a contributor to as well as cited or republished in philosophy of science and cognitive science volumes and encyclopedias.

== Promotion of conspiracy theories ==
Fetzer alleges government conspiracies include an involvement in the assassination of President Kennedy. He believes Kennedy's assassination was "a government hit job" and "the Zapruder film is a fake". With Don "Four Arrows" Jacobs, Fetzer claimed that the 2002 airplane crash that killed US Senator Paul Wellstone was an assassination "by an out-of-control Republican cabal under the direction of" Karl Rove. He also claimed that Paul McCartney died in 1966.

Fetzer has alleged the 9/11 attacks were treasonable, and called for the military overthrow of President George W. Bush. He has asserted that the World Trade Center buildings collapsed by controlled demolitions or by high-tech weaponry, gaining further critical attention. In 2005, with Steven E. Jones, Fetzer co-founded Scholars for 9/11 Truth. Within a year, Jones wrote to other members of Scholars for 9/11 Truth declaring he and others wished to sever their connections with the organization, because Fetzer's backing of theories about a direct energy weapon had left them open to severe mockery. Jovan Byford criticized Fetzer's speculations that Jews or Israel were involved in a conspiracy to commit the 9/11 attacks as "a contemporary variant of the old, antisemitic conspiracist canard about the disloyalty of Jews and their usurpation of power in the name of communal interests and the accumulation of wealth." Fetzer has asserted that elements in the US Department of Defense, US intelligence and the Israeli Mossad were involved in the attacks.

An article by Fetzer published by Iranian state-run Press TV and pro-Russian conspiracy theory and fake news website Veterans Today titled (by the latter) "Did Mossad death squads slaughter American children at Sandy Hook?" was described in January 2013 by Oliver Kamm in The Jewish Chronicle as "monstrous, calumnious, demented bilge" that "violates all bounds of decency". Fetzer was a member of the Advisory Board of Veterans Today in 2013. In 2015, Fetzer published a book co-written with Mike Palacek titled Nobody Died at Sandy Hook: It Was a FEMA Drill to Promote Gun Control, which argued the Sandy Hook Elementary School shooting never happened. It was removed from circulation by its publisher, Moon Rock Books, after Sandy Hook parent Leonard Pozner won a defamation lawsuit against Fetzer in 2019.

In December 2015 Iran's Tasnim News Agency published an interview with Fetzer where he claims the Charlie Hebdo shooting, the November 2015 Paris attacks, and the Islamic State beheading incidents were staged.

Fetzer has also promoted theories that the Boston Marathon bombing, Parkland and Pulse nightclub shootings, and the Charlottesville car attack were hoaxes or classified training exercises, as he also alleged about Sandy Hook, and believes the Apollo Moon landings were faked.

Fetzer contributed the foreword for a book entitled Breaking The Spell (2014) by Nicholas Kollerstrom, a work of Holocaust denial. Fetzer has said of the Holocaust: "My research on the Holocaust narrative suggests that it is not only untrue but provably false and not remotely scientifically sustainable."

In 2013, officials of the University of Minnesota, where Fetzer was a professor 1987 to 2006, said that "Fetzer has the right to express his views, but he also has the responsibility to make clear he's not speaking for the university." He has not been employed by the university since his retirement.

Fetzer has backed claims the 2020 United States presidential election was "stolen" from Donald Trump.

== Lawsuits ==
Leonard Pozner, father of Sandy Hook victim Noah Pozner, sued Fetzer and his co-author Mike Palacek for defamation in a Dane County, Wisconsin, court for statements contained in Nobody Died at Sandy Hook. Pozner’s son Noah, 6, was the youngest of the 26 people killed in the mass shooting. Fetzer and Palacek proceeded pro se. In June 2019, circuit judge Frank Remington found that Fetzer and Palacek had defamed the Pozners. On October 16, 2019, a jury in Wisconsin awarded Leonard Pozner $450,000 for defamation. Fetzer's petition for certiorari to the Supreme Court of the United States was denied on October 3, 2022.
