= True Pundit =

Far-right fake news website (2016–2021)

- Company type: Limited liability company
- Website type: Fake news website
- Available in: English
- Founded: 2016
- Key people: Michael D. Moore
- Website: truepundit.com
- Advertising: Yes
- Commercial: Yes
- Current status: Inactive

True Pundit is a far-right (Note: Sources describing True Pundit as far-right:) fake news website (Note: Sources describing True Pundit as a fake news website:) known for publishing conspiracy theories. (Note: Sources describing True Pundit as a publisher of conspiracy theories:) According to The Atlantic, True Pundit had "a well-known modus operandi, perfected during the 2016 U.S. election: running baseless stories and then asking leading questions".

True Pundit was "fluent in the paranoid language of 2016 social media" and often credited false stories about the FBI and Hillary Clinton to anonymous sources and claimed the mainstream media was covering it up. The website helped spread the Pizzagate conspiracy theory and the Plandemic conspiracy theory. It was often promoted by partisan and conspiracy websites and prominent pro-Trump figures, including Donald Trump and Donald Trump Jr.

True Pundit earned revenue by selling merchandise and advertising with Revcontent, a service that monetized fake news sites, and briefly worked with the ad firm Intermarkets. In 2018, True Pundit was accused of stealing content for articles and their YouTube channel was terminated for "spam, deceptive practices and misleading content or other Terms of Service violations".

== Notable conspiracy theories ==
In October 2016, True Pundit was the source of the false claim that Hillary Clinton asked, "Can’t we just drone this guy?" about Julian Assange. The conspiracy theory was amplified by WikiLeaks, InfoWars, RT, Heat Street and Fox News. WikiLeaks sent a private message to Donald Trump Jr. asking him to "comment on/push" the story. Trump Jr. replied that he "already did that".

In November 2016, True Pundit contributed to the creation, spread and revival of the Pizzagate conspiracy theory. The article was the website's most popular story on Facebook. The website also published false stories about Hillary Clinton wearing an earpiece at a debate, using hand signals with debate moderators, and being drunk before a campaign rally.

In 2016 and 2017, True Pundit promoted conspiracy theories that mass shootings in Las Vegas and at the Orlando Pulse nightclub involved FBI cover-ups and a conspiracy theory related to Trump Tower wiretapping allegations.

In February 2018, True Pundit promoted conspiracy theories about the Parkland high school shooting. In August 2018, True Pundit was the first to imply a link between a Pizzagate conspiracy theorist's death and the Clinton family.

In 2020, True Pundit played a key role in boosting the Plandemic conspiracy theory.

== History ==
The website for True Pundit was registered in March 2016 and launched that June. True Pundit was created by Michael D. Moore using the pseudonym Thomas Paine and managed by True Pundit Media LLC.

In 2017, Moore said True Pundit was "flattered to be accused of participating in disinformation campaigns" for Russia and implied that mainstream media do the same for other governments.

== Thomas Paine pseudonym ==
Michael D. Moore had a background in journalism, a criminal record from an FBI investigation, and a history of illegal business practices when he created True Pundit in 2016 using the pseudonym, Thomas Paine. Moore's autobiography as Thomas Paine says he won the Gerald Loeb Award, and falsely claimed he was nominated for a Pulitzer Prize for Investigative Reporting twice and a George Polk Political Reporting award once. On Twitter, he falsely claimed he won a Polk award. In YouTube appearances Moore has praised Infowars conspiracy theorist and QAnon proponent Jerome Corsi.

In 1996, Moore won a Gerald Loeb Award with two colleagues and reported about TWA Flight 800. Moore said that in the late 1990s he left journalism to work in "intelligence" and started the company "Dig Dirt" with the tagline "investigative intelligence". When Moore's newspaper learned about Dig Dirt, they opened an internal investigation. The paper's editor said it "very clearly created the appearance and potential for a conflict of interest" but Moore was cleared of wrongdoing. Moore resigned from the newspaper and said he was mistreated because he was investigated by colleagues.

In 1999, Moore sued Steptoe & Johnson for $10 million alleging they had launched a "cyber war" and hacked into Dig Dirt's websites and posted defamatory messages about him "and tried to cover it all up by doing their evil deeds under an e-identity swiped from an Alexandria, Virginia, furniture store owner". Moore alleged that the firm attempted to penetrate his systems using a domain he had been cybersquatting on. The lawsuit was dismissed in August 2000. Later that year, he was ordered to pay $25,000 in damages for squatting on six domains of law firms names. When the law firms contacted Moore and objected to the cybersquatting, he asked for money.
