= Leonard Pozner =

Father of a Sandy Hook Elementary School shooting victim and target of online hate speech

- Born: 1967 (age 58–59)
- Occupation: Founder of the HONR Network
- Known for: Father of Sandy Hook shooting victim Noah Pozner; Advocacy to protect victims of online harassment, especially those targeted by conspiracy theorists.
- Spouse: Veronique de la Rosa (m. 2003; div. 2015)
- Children: Noah and 3 daughters
- Website: www.HONRNetwork.org

Leonard Pozner (born 1967) is the father of a Sandy Hook Elementary School shooting victim, Noah Pozner. He is the founder of the HONR Network, a nonprofit organization that supports victims of mass violence who experience hate speech and harassment online.

== Sandy Hook Elementary School shooting ==
On December 14, 2012, 20-year-old Adam Lanza murdered 20 children and 6 teachers at Sandy Hook Elementary school before committing suicide. One of the children killed was Pozner's six-year-old son Noah. Shortly afterwards, conspiracy theorists used Facebook, YouTube, blogs, and other online platforms to claim the massacre was a hoax and a false flag operation and that the victims were actually crisis actors. Most notable among them was radio show host Alex Jones, owner of InfoWars, who instructed his audience to rise up and "find out the truth", insisting that the shooting was staged by the federal government to destroy the Second Amendment. Pozner and other family members of victims were accused of lying about the deaths or sometimes the entire existence of their deceased children. They received a campaign of harassment, including death threats, from people who contacted them in person, online, and over the phone.

Pozner began attempting to remove defamatory content about his family, including defaced photos of Noah, from social media and web sites. He stated that "conspiracy theories erase history" and expressed concern for how the Sandy Hook shooting would be remembered in a hundred years.

After Pozner succeeded in getting Infowars videos removed from YouTube, Jones publicized Pozner's personal information including addresses associated with his family. To escape harassment, Pozner moved with Noah's mother, Veronique De La Rosa Haller, and their two surviving children (one of Noah’s three sisters was in university so didn’t live with the family) out of Connecticut. The harassment continued, and it continued after several of their subsequent moves, because conspiracy theorists stalked the family and published their new addresses online. They currently live in hiding in a high-security community hundreds of miles from where Noah is buried.

Floridian Lucy Richards repeatedly transmitted death threats to Pozner through interstate communications. In 2017, she was sentenced to 5 months in prison and was prohibited from visiting conspiracy-promoting websites such as Infowars as part of her parole. US district judge James Cohn called Richards' actions towards Pozner "disturbing".

=== Activism and HONR Network ===
In 2014, Pozner founded the HONR Network to "bring awareness to hoaxer activity" and "prosecute those who wittingly and publicly defame, harass and emotionally abuse the victims of high-profile tragedies". Before the efforts were organized into a 501(c)(3) nonprofit organization, Pozner organized volunteers to report harassment en masse to social media platforms. Some of the volunteers became involved after emailing Pozner with requests to support his work. The Guardian reported in 2017 that HONR Network had 300 volunteers.

== Campaigns ==
Pozner and the HONR Network have had success in changing social media policies and removing harmful online content. In July 2018, Pozner and De La Rosa wrote an open letter to Mark Zuckerberg which was published by The Guardian website. In the letter they appealed for help from the Facebook CEO, urging him to honor the pledge he made in the US Senate: to make Facebook a safer and more hospitable place for social interaction. Pozner and De La Rosa suggested two ways to better protect victims from harassment: "Treat victims of mass shootings and other tragedies as a protected group, such that attacks on them are specifically against Facebook policy. And provide affected people with access to Facebook staff who will remove hateful and harassing posts against victims immediately." Facebook has since taken steps to recognize these victims and Pozner now works with its content moderators and policymakers.

Pozner has also had success with other online platforms by flagging harmful content for violations such as invasions of privacy, threats and harassment, and copyright infringement. In 2018, HONR Network reported 2,568 videos to YouTube and had 1,555 removed. Blog hosting platform WordPress.com initially refused to help. Its parent company Automattic repeatedly responded to Pozner's requests with generic form letters saying "because we believe this to be fair use of the material, we will not be removing it at this time" along with a warning to him that the company could collect damages from people who "knowingly materially misrepresent" copyrights. After the company's response generated controversy, Automattic apologized and enacted a policy to prohibit blogs from the "malicious publication of unauthorized, identifying images of minors". This policy meant that images of child victims would be removed. HONR Network's advocacy led to policy changes at Google's YouTube, Facebook, and WordPress, resulting in the removal of thousands of Sandy Hook denial videos, posts, and related content. Pozner stated that Google Search began making hoax material about the Sandy Hook shooting less authoritative. In May 2019, online activist group Avaaz organized meetings with executives from Twitter and Facebook to further the campaign against online hate and misinformation. Speaking at the meetings were journalist Jessikka Aro and teenage vaccination advocate Ethan Lindenberger. Pozner participated in the meetings remotely and spoke of the need to curb online harassment. "I am a strong proponent of the First Amendment, and free speech is an essential aspect of American society. However, there is a fundamental misunderstanding of people's rights and responsibilities online. A person cannot violate my civil rights to be free of harassment, bullying, or to have my likeness manipulated and my family targeted with death threats and intimidation and then simply attempt to hide behind 'free speech.'"

== Legal action against perpetrators of Sandy Hook conspiracy theories ==
=== Alex Jones defamation case ===
In April 2018, in state district courts in Travis County, Texas, lawyers representing Pozner and his ex-wife Veronique de la Rosa launched a defamation suit against Alex Jones. In August 2018, Judge Scott Jenkins rejected Jones' argument and his motion to dismiss the lawsuit. In the month following the launch of the defamation suits, separate actions were launched in Connecticut, by another six families of Sandy Hook victims, and one FBI agent who was a first responder at the scene. In February 2019, in response to this suit, Judge Barbara Bellis ruled that Jones will have to submit to a sworn deposition, in addition to turning over internal financial, business, and marketing documents related to InfoWars' operations. In 2019, Jones and Infowars lost an appeal against the district court's denial of their motion to dismiss.

The same law firm filed similar defamation cases against Alex Jones and Infowars on behalf of two other parents who lost children at Sandy Hook — Neil Heslin and Scarlett Lewis.

In a separate case by the same lawyers, Marcel Fontaine launched defamation proceedings against Jones for falsely identifying him as the gunman in the Stoneman Douglas High School shooting. In response, Jones attempted to have the Pozner and Fontaine cases dismissed under the Texas Citizens Participation Act. This act is designed to protect citizens' right to free speech against plaintiffs who aim to silence them through costly litigation. Jones also sought more than $100,000 in court costs from the Pozner family.

As of February 2021, Jones and Infowars lost appeals about all four cases in the Texas Third District Court of Appeal; were denied review by the Texas Supreme Court; and are pending motions for reconsideration of those denials.

The plaintiffs' law firm, Farrar & Ball, set up a website with the filings in each of these cases, and published two videos of their deposition of Alex Jones.

Wired magazine has described the Pozner versus Jones case as highly significant with regards to free speech in the digital age. "Whether Jones wins or loses, his suit, according to First Amendment lawyers, will be a building block for the way we think of free speech in the age of the internet."

=== Nobody Died at Sandy Hook book ===
In June 2019, Leonard Pozner filed a defamation lawsuit against James Fetzer, one of the editors of the book Nobody Died at Sandy Hook, which falsely claimed that the Sandy Hook shooting was staged and questioned the authenticity of Noah Pozner’s death certificate.

The Wisconsin court found that the book’s claims were false and defamatory, granting Pozner summary judgment on liability in October 2019.

A later ruling determined damages, ordering Fetzer to pay Pozner US$450,000 in compensatory damages and additional costs. The court later added a $650,000 contempt sanction, for a total of about $1.1 million.

Pozner’s testimony in the case described years of harassment resulting from conspiracy theories about the shooting. The judgment in his favor became one of several successful defamation actions brought by Sandy Hook families against individuals who promoted false claims about the attack.
