= Veterans Today =

Fake news website

- Website type: Conspiracy theory website
- Available in: English
- Founded: 2004
- Website: www.vtforeignpolicy.com
- Registration: Optional

Veterans Today, also known as VT Foreign Policy, is an American antisemitic and conspiracy theory website. It describes itself as a "military veterans and foreign affairs journal", while multiple sources describe it as a pro-Kremlin propaganda outlet.

== History ==
Veterans Today was founded in 2004 "in opposition to the invasion of Iraq." According to Politico, the site "soon began publishing wild conspiracy theories" and "has consistently published articles that push the Kremlin party line". It has ties with the Iranian state media outlet Press TV, and has had ties with Russia's New Eastern Outlook website since 2013, though according to The Daily Beast, the latter connection ended in 2018. The website is formally partnered with several other Russian institutions. The New Hampshire Union Leader says that the website mixes "advice for veterans on how to find jobs and pay medical bills" with conspiracy theories and Russian propaganda. Its editorial board includes a former head of Pakistan's intelligence services.

It has published false headlines such as, "Pravda: Ukraine indignant at 80% of Jews in power" and "Water Terrorism by India to Overawe Pakistan." A joint article with Press TV, written by Jim Fetzer, was entitled: "Did Mossad death squads slaughter American children at Sandy Hook?" According to Veterans Today, Israel was behind the 9/11 attacks in collaboration with the United States and Julian Assange of WikiLeaks is controlled by the Israeli government. Duff wrote in an August 2021 article for the website: "The biggest story of the last 20 years is one of the brazen uses of nuclear weapons by Israel against its perceived enemies. Israel nuked the US on 9/11 and [Veterans Today] has proven it beyond a doubt."

In 2012, the website's chairman, Gordon Duff, told an interviewer that "about 30% of what's written on Veterans Today, is patently false. About 40% of what I write, is at least purposely, partially false, because if I didn't write false information I wouldn't be alive".

Duff spoke at a conference organized by the Syrian government Counterterrorism and Religious Extremism Conference held in Syria on November 30 and December 1, 2014. The four-man Veterans Today delegation (eight Americans in all were present) also included managing editor Jim Dean. During his speech, he indicated his delegation from Veterans Today wanted:

to try to establish a method of communication that will allow Syria and other nations in the area to understand Israel's control of the U.S., the control of the U.S. by organized crime, and how the U.S. government is subservient to a worldwide criminal organization.

In February 2022, a piece by Thomas Ertl largely justifies Russia's invasion of Ukraine and says it is a lie that Ukraine is a sovereign country.

== Reception ==
According to British journalist Oliver Kamm, Veterans Today "promotes conspiracy theories, including Holocaust denial". James Kirchick, writing in Time magazine, calls Veterans Today a "virulently anti-Semitic website".

The Times of Israel describes it as "a clearinghouse of anti-Semitic conspiracy theories". According to The Jerusalem Post, the website has published "articles defending Hitler, and promotes Ku Klux Klan leader David Duke and the anti-semitic musician Gilad Atzmon". Michael C. Moynihan, writing for The Daily Beast, has described it as a "Holocaust denial outfit". Veterans Today has said the Holocaust either did not occur or has been greatly inflated alleging it has been invented by the Jews to manipulate non-Jews. The Forward describes Veterans Today as "a hub for anti-Israel conspiracy theories." Vice magazine called it "conspiracy-oriented".

The Southern Poverty Law Center (SPLC) is highly critical of the website, stating that "the anti-Israel bent on VT can slide pretty quickly into overt anti-Semitism."

== See also ==
- Alan Sabrosky
