= Crisis actor =

Individual who portrays a disaster victim

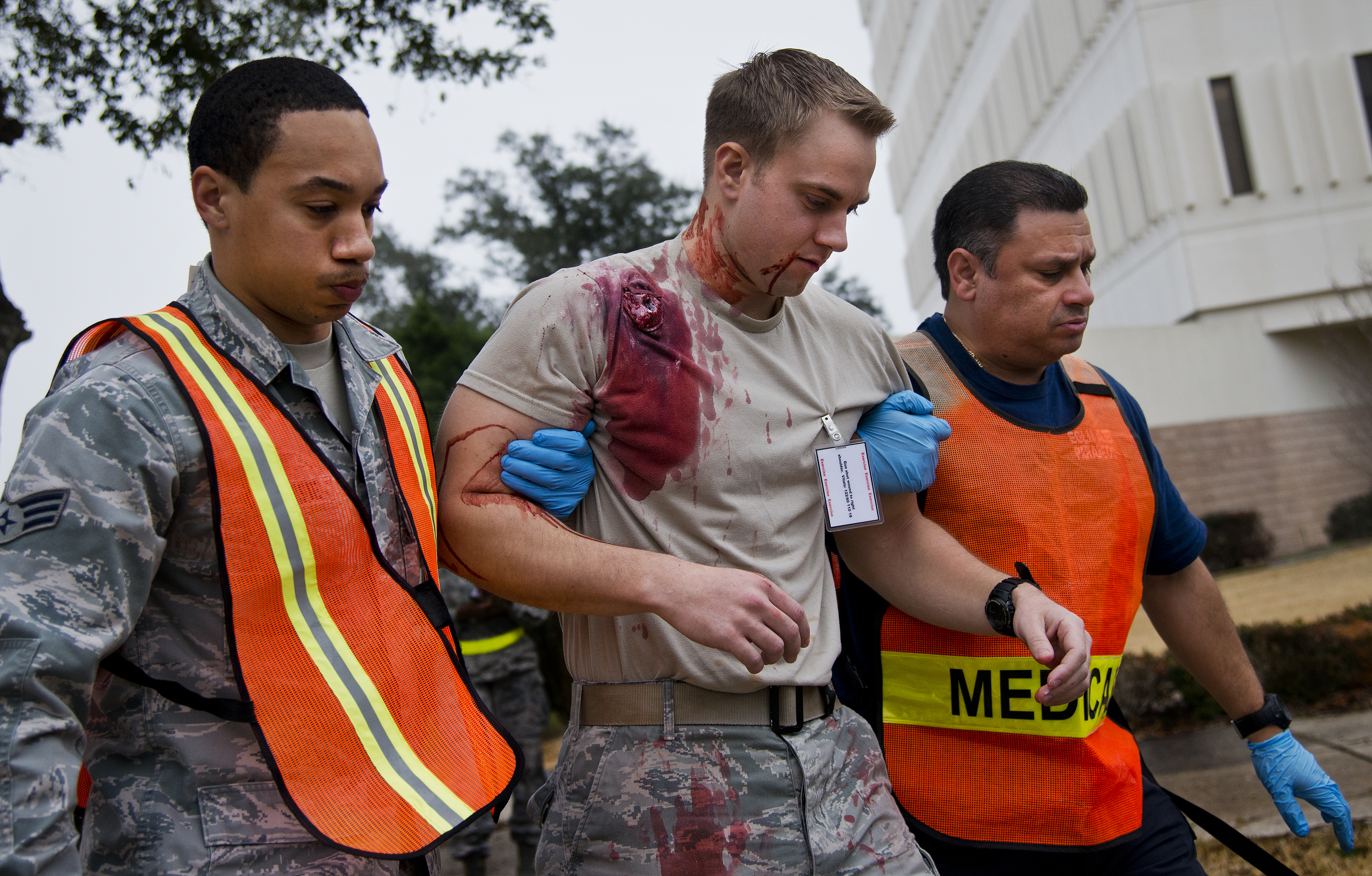
Emergency medical technicians from the 96th Medical Group move an airman pretending to be wounded toward safety during an active shooter exercise at Eglin Air Force Base in Florida in 2014.

A crisis actor (a.k.a. actor-patient or actor victim) is a trained actor, role player, volunteer, or other person engaged to portray a disaster victim during emergency drills to train first responders such as police, firefighters or EMT personnel. Crisis actors are used to create high-fidelity simulations of disasters in order to allow first responders to practice their skills and help emergency services to prepare and train in realistic scenarios as part of full-scale disaster exercises.

The term has been taken up and used by conspiracy theorists who claim that some mass shootings and other terror events are staged for the advancement of various political objectives, such as to advance gun control measures.

== Disaster training simulations ==
Actors take on the role of mock victims and simulate specific injuries from a disaster to add life-like realism to an emergency exercise. Theatrical makeup and cosmetics, plus rubber and latex appliances, are often used to simulate a variety of wounds or medical conditions that realistically portray victim's injuries, a practice known as medical moulage.

Actors who portray news reporters, relatives of victims, and concerned citizens are also used during drills to train emergency operations center personnel to cope with a variety of emotionally-charged demands and requests.

== Conspiracy theories and defamation ==
In the United States, the term has been used by conspiracy theorists who claim that some mass shootings and other terror events are staged for the advancement of various political objectives such as to advance gun control measures. Conspiracy theorists' use of the term is thought to have originated in 2012, when a blog post by former professor and conspiracy theorist James Tracy suggested that the government could have hired an acting agency named Visionbox to help stage the Sandy Hook Elementary School shooting. Visionbox offered dramatic training "in criminal and victim behavior" to actors intended to help "bring intense realism to simulated mass casualty incidents in public places".

Tracy also promoted a crisis actor conspiracy theory of the Boston Marathon bombing. Conspiracy theorists have falsely claimed such attacks are "false flag operations" staged by conspirators, usually government or corporate forces, in order to achieve some goal such as justifying increased government surveillance, disarmament of the population, or military action against blamed nations or groups. Crisis actors are claimed in this context to play the part of bystanders or witnesses, emergency response personnel, and (with the aid of stage makeup) wounded victims of the attack.

Advocates of the conspiracy theory include Alex Jones and outlets such as True Pundit. In April 2018, the parents of two children killed in the Sandy Hook shooting launched a lawsuit against Jones for defamation "accusing him and his website InfoWars of engaging in a campaign of 'false, cruel, and dangerous assertions'". In November 2021, Jones was found liable by default after failing to provide documents to the court and announced he would appeal the decision. In August 2022, the Heslin v. Jones jury ordered that Jones pay $4.1M in compensatory damages and $45.2M in punitive damages. During the trial, Jones admitted that the Sandy Hook shooting was "100% real", and he agreed with his own attorney that it was "absolutely irresponsible" to push falsehoods about the shooting and its victims.

During the Gaza war, accusations of victims on both sides of the war being "crisis actors" have circulated on social media.

== See also ==
- Roleplay simulation
