= Alan Sabrosky =

American Marine officer and author

Alan Sabrosky is a retired Marine officer and former Director of Studies at the United States Army War College's Strategic Studies Institute, where he held the position of the Douglas MacArthur Chair of Research. He received the Superior Civilian Service Award in 1998. He has taught at the United States Military Academy at West Point; Georgetown University; the University of Pennsylvania; and the Johns Hopkins University School of Advanced International Studies. His publications have mainly focused on alliance systems and unionization in the United States military. He co-authored a book called Prisoners of War?: Nation-States in the Modern Era.

== Academic career ==
Sabrosky earned a master's degree in history and a doctorate in political science from the University of Michigan. He worked at the Foreign Policy Research Institute for most of the 1970s and was appointed director of FPRI in 1981, but ran the organization into debt and resigned a year later. He has taught at Catholic University and Georgetown University.

=== Alliance theory ===
Sabrosky's work on alliance theory showed that a conflict escalates when a major power intervenes in a war between a minor state and another major state. He has identified three types of conflicts in this analysis: "localized wars" between the original belligerents, "expanded wars" which include several belligerents, and enlarged wars that include a major power on both sides of the conflict.

=== Unionization of the military ===
In the book Blue Collar Soldiers: Unionization and the U.S. Military Sabrosky, who edited the volume, states that "military unions are simply too great a risk for a political democracy" adding that it would be "unwise to expect unions not to act like unions over the long term, and in doing so call into question the basis of our national security".

== Claims of antisemitism ==
Sabrosky has been critical of American Jews who serve in the Israel Defense Forces (IDF), but not in the U.S. armed forces. Daniel Flesch, a former IDF paratrooper, has called Sabrosky a conspiracy theorist and criticized him for writing that "a large majority of American Jews ... espouse a form of political bigamy called dual loyalty".

The Anti-Defamation League named Sabrosky as a key figure in antisemitic 9/11 conspiracy theories. Sabrosky stated that he "arrived" as a 9/11 "Truther" in 2009 and spent over a decade alternately stating that the U.S. military establishment knows that Israel was behind the attacks instead of Al-Qaeda but won't support 9/11 Truthers by publicly stating that, or bragging that 9/11 Truthers have "won" the "battle" over the truth of 9/11 and are merely waiting for the Federal government to publicly admit their defeat to the American populace. However, in October 2021 Sabrosky lamented that the 9/11 movement had completely failed at all of its goals, with the 20th anniversary of the terrorist attacks by Al-Qaeda being noteworthy for the non-presence of the Truthers.

Although Sabrosky has one Jewish grandparent, he does not identify particularly strongly with this Jewish ancestry, stating "an outside identity, Jewish or other, has never meant much at all to me. I'm an American", distinguishing himself from "an awful lot of American Jews [who] do not think of themselves as Americans who happen to be Jewish, but as Jews who happen to be living in America."

== See also ==
- Veterans Today
