= Paul Joseph Watson =

English YouTuber, radio host, and conspiracy theorist (born 1982)

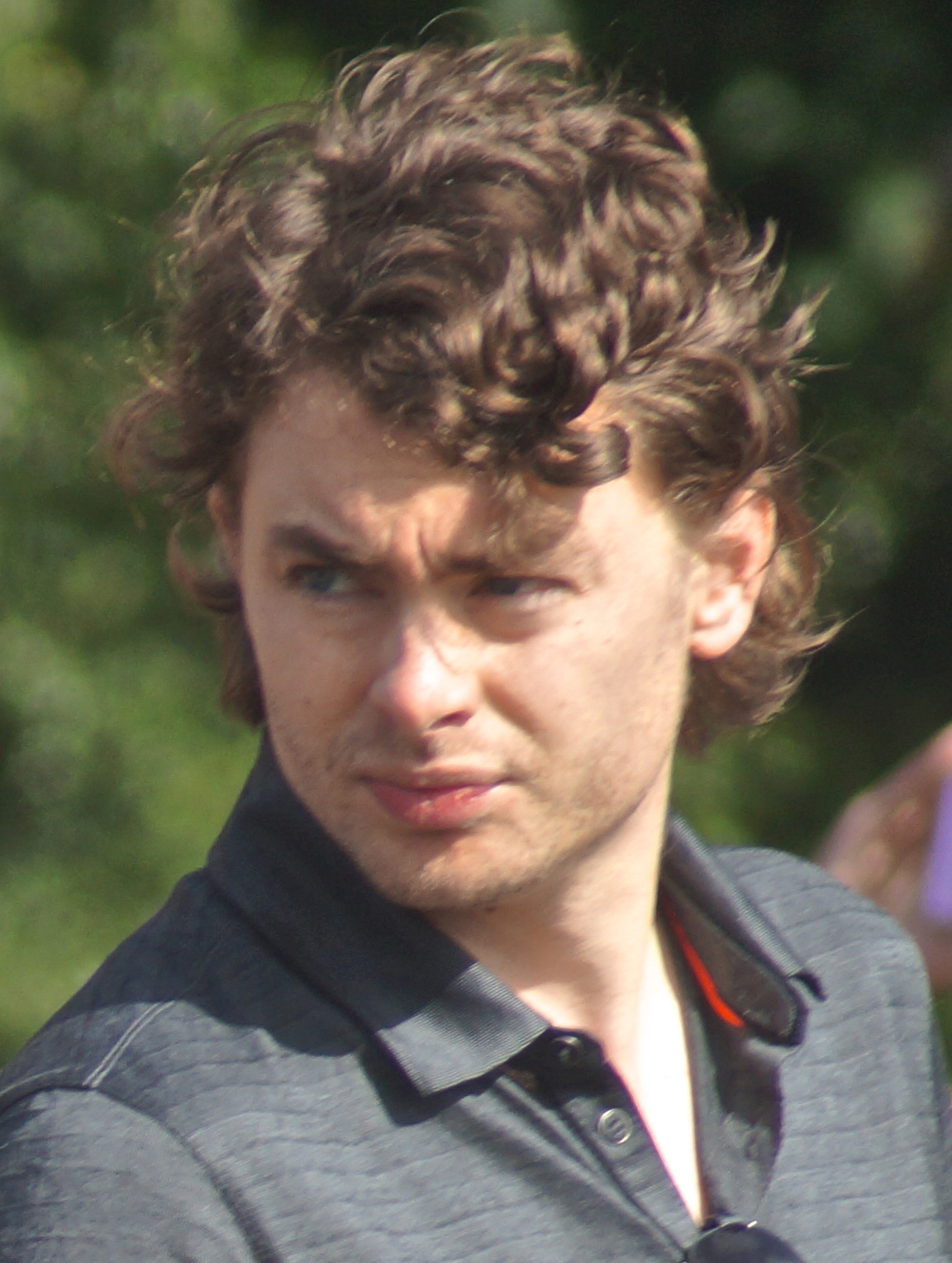
- Watson outside the 2013 Bilderberg Conference
- Born: 24 May 1982 (age 44); Sheffield, South Yorkshire, England
- Other names: PJW; Paul J. Watson; PropagandaMatrix (formerly)
- Occupations: Blogger; radio host; YouTube personality

X information
- Handle: @PrisonPlanet

YouTube information
- Channel: Paul Joseph Watson
- Years active: 2011–present
- Genres: Political criticism; conspiracy theories; far-right politics
- Subscribers: 2.1 million
- Views: 836 million
- Last updated: 27 October 2026
- Website: modernity.news

Paul Joseph Watson (born 24 May 1982) is a British YouTuber, radio host and conspiracy theorist. In 2002, he began working at the American radio host Alex Jones's website InfoWars, where Watson promoted and advocated for 9/11, chemtrail and New World Order conspiracy theories. He would later promote fake news stories like Pizzagate. He later shifted his focus to criticisms of feminism, Islam and left-wing politics. Watson also contributed to InfoWars's talk radio programme The Alex Jones Show, which he occasionally hosts or co-hosts.

Since 2011, Watson has hosted his own YouTube channel, Paul Joseph Watson, on which he expresses his views on topics such as contemporary society, politics and modern liberalism in an often mocking manner. His YouTube channel criticises and mocks the "woke mob", social justice warriors, feminism and anti-racist movements. Until July 2016 he embraced the label "alt-right", but he now identifies as part of the New Right. In May 2019 Facebook and Instagram permanently banned him for violation of their hate speech policies. As at September 2026 his YouTube page has over 2.09 million subscribers.

== Early life ==
Paul Joseph Watson was born on 24 May 1982 at Jessop Hospital in Sheffield, South Yorkshire, England, to Philip and Hazel Watson. In a 2016 interview for a student newspaper in Sheffield, Watson said he grew up on a council estate with few financial resources, and that by 18 he was teetotal and exercising three hours per day. However, a 2018 article for The Daily Beast said his birth certificate indicated the family lived in a house in Grenoside, a suburban district in the north of the city; Sheffield City Council stated that the house had never been in public ownership. According to The Daily Beast, "the Watson family would live in a series of similar communities that run along the leafy northwest suburbs of Sheffield, separating the city from the picturesque Peak District National Park" over the next twenty years. From just before the age of ten, Watson and his family lived in Loxley, another area of Sheffield.

Watson described his formative moment as being when, at the age of 18, he watched The Secret Rulers of the World, a documentary in which the journalist Jon Ronson accompanied Alex Jones in infiltrating Bohemian Grove in California, a place where some conspiracy theorists believe global elites plot the New World Order. He has described the British conspiracy theorist David Icke, whom he first read as a teenager, as the person who woke him up. According to Watson, he was initially invited to contribute by Alex Jones in 2002, and rapidly gained substantial compensation for his work on InfoWars, as stated by the former spouse of the site's founder.

== Political self-identification ==
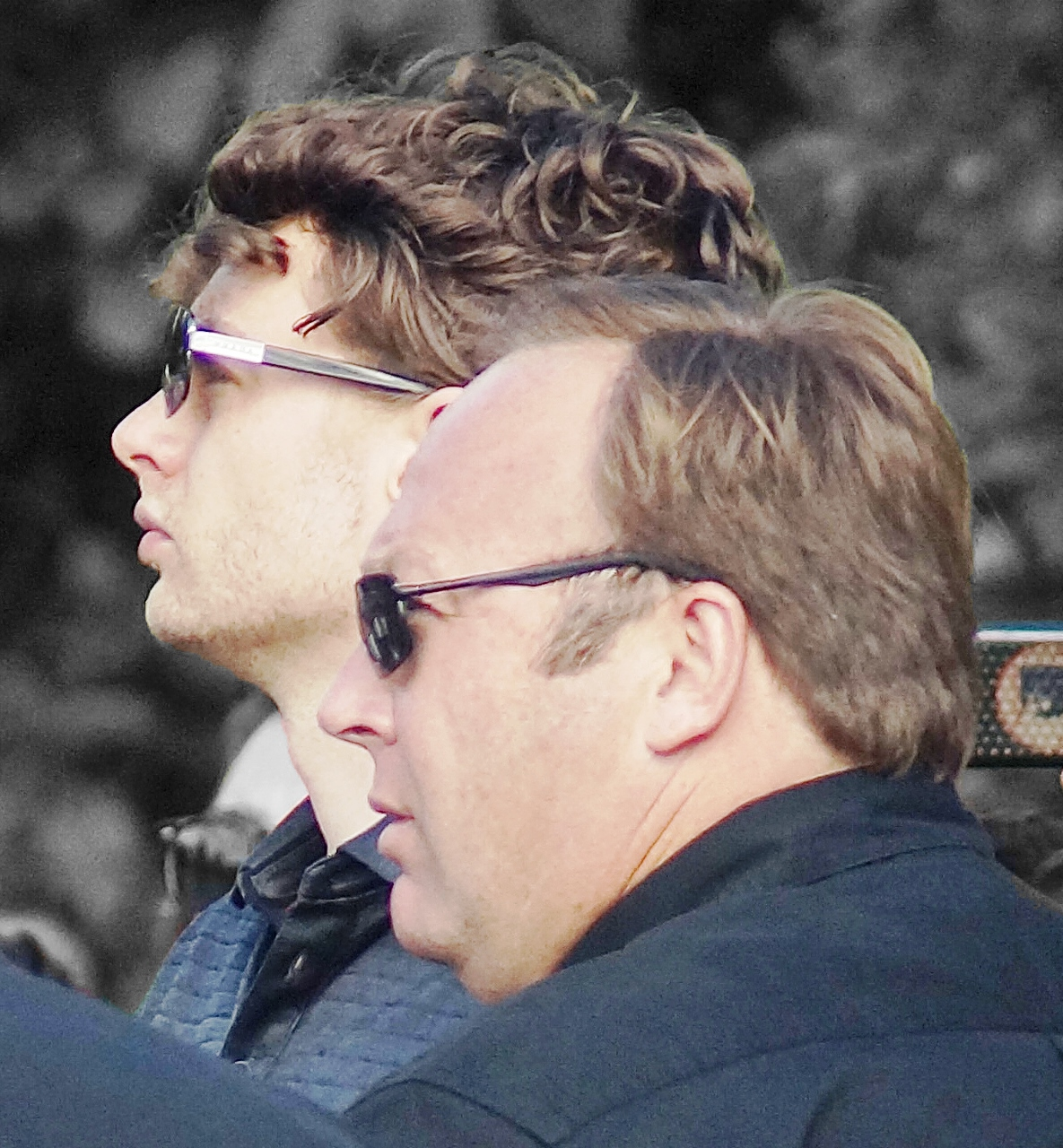
Watson with InfoWars owner Alex Jones in June 2013

Watson, along with Jones and InfoWars as a whole, originally covered conspiracy theories such as chemtrails, the New World Order and the Illuminati. By the mid-2010s their coverage increasingly shifted to criticising feminism, Islam and left-wing politics. Watson has been described as a member of "the new far-right" by The New York Times, which wrote in August 2017 that his "videos are straightforward nativist polemics, with a particular focus on Europe" and convey his opposition to modernist architecture and modern art. Iman Abou Atta, director of the anti-Islamophobia group Tell MAMA, has said that Watson "has become 'the' nexus for anti-Muslim accounts that we have mapped... He has become an influencer in promoting information—much of it bizarre and untrue—which has been regurgitated by anti-Muslim and anti-migrant accounts time and time again."

Watson previously described himself as a libertarian and supported Ron Paul in the 2012 United States presidential election. In a 2016 tweet he said he no longer considered himself a libertarian because the American politician Gary Johnson "made the term an embarrassment." Watson has also called himself a conservative and considers modern-day conservatism a countercultural movement. In a November 2016 Facebook post he differentiated between the New Right and the alt-right. He claimed that the alt-right "likes to fester in dark corners of subreddits and obsess about Jews, racial superiority and Adolf Hitler." He and Mike Cernovich have feuded with figures such as Richard B. Spencer and David Duke, who see white nationalism as necessary for the alt-right.

Although he endorsed Donald Trump in the 2016 United States presidential election, Watson declared in a tweet on 6 April 2017 that he was "officially OFF the Trump train" after Trump's decision to launch missile strikes on Syria in response to a Khan Shaykhun chemical attack several days earlier, believing Trump had reneged on his promise not to intervene in Syria. He said Trump was "just another deep state/Neo-con puppet". After a decrease in Twitter followers occurred, he denied he had "turned on Trump", saying he was only "off the Trump train in terms of Syria" and blaming the media for "fake news". He declared in a separate tweet he would shift his focus to ensuring the French presidential candidate Marine Le Pen of the National Front would be elected in the 2017 presidential election, which she lost. Donald Trump Jr. retweeted Watson's reference to French celebrities leaving France if Le Pen were elected and referred dismissively to similar reputed claims in the US before Trump was elected.

On 16 June 2018 Watson announced that he had joined the UK Independence Party (UKIP) along with the YouTubers Mark Meechan and Carl Benjamin.

== In traditional media ==
In 2016 Watson was an early proponent of allegations that the American politician Hillary Clinton suffers from numerous serious medical conditions, though he was unable to provide any evidence. Watson's part in the manufacture and dissemination of the rumour was taken up by the National Enquirer and mentioned in the mainstream media as part of a discussion of the role of rumour and conspiracy theory in the 2016 US presidential election.

In February 2017 Watson tweeted an offer to pay for a journalist to visit Sweden and stay in the "crime-ridden migrant suburbs" of Malmö, if they think it would be safe. Many journalists took him up on the offer, and Watson chose the American journalist and videographer Tim Pool, who was already planning a similar investigation. Watson gave Pool US$2,000 for the trip. Pool's findings contradicted Watson's claims.

At a press briefing at the White House in November 2018, persistent questioning of Trump led an intern to attempt to take a microphone from the hand of CNN's Jim Acosta. Acosta's White House press credentials were subsequently revoked, allegedly for having "put his hands" on the intern. Watson uploaded an edited version of the original footage in support of this claim. In this version, zoom and frame rate changes create the misleading impression that Acosta had behaved aggressively towards the intern.

Watson confirmed that he had applied a zoom and denied making any other alterations, though expert analysis confirmed that "the clip repeats several frames that do not appear in the original footage" and that it had been sped up. The video has generally been described as doctored, though some experts concluded that the changes do not necessarily represent deliberate manipulation but could be artefacts of accidental degradation during processing. White House Press Secretary Sarah Huckabee Sanders pointed to the video that Watson posted as clearly documenting Acosta's "inappropriate behaviour". The White House was criticised for sharing a doctored video and thereby spreading "actual fake news" rather than using the original footage. A subsequent court ruling found that the action against Acosta was unconstitutional on due process grounds.

On 2 May 2019 Watson and several other people considered to be extremists, including the Nation of Islam leader Louis Farrakhan, Jones and the right-wing commentator Milo Yiannopoulos, were permanently banned from Facebook, which called them "dangerous". "We've always banned individuals or organizations that promote or engage in violence and hate, regardless of ideology", a Facebook spokesperson said. "The process for evaluating potential violators is extensive and it is what led us to our decision to remove these accounts today." Watson tweeted that he had broken "none of their rules" and complained of "an authoritarian society controlled by a handful of Silicon Valley giants" in which "all dissent must be purged." Trump retweeted Watson, mocking the "dangerous" epithet.

== Views ==
=== Immigration ===
Watson is anti-immigration. He has claimed that "Malmö is known as 'Sweden's Chicago'" due to mass immigration into the country. According to a study published in Critical Studies in Media Communication, this claim is false.

In 2022 Watson criticised French president Emmanuel Macron and France's African migrant communities following the murder of a Jewish man in Paris.

=== Islam ===
Watson is opposed to Islam. He has labelled Muslim culture "horrific" and declared that it produces mass rape, "Islamic ghettos" and the destruction of Western culture. Watson has said that the western world needs "Islam control" rather than gun control. In an InfoWars article, Watson wrote, "Muslims living in both the Middle East and the west show alarmingly high levels of support for violent jihad" and that there is "violent oppression of gays and Christians in the Middle East". In August 2017 he said that YouTube had blocked monetisation on all his videos about Islam as part of the website's policies dealing with hate speech, and on other subjects including modern art.

In November 2023, following the 7 October 2023 Hamas-led attack on Israel and the subsequent Israel–Gaza war, Watson posted commentary about the conflict on his Telegram channel and X account. According to the Institute for Strategic Dialogue, his posts highlighted alleged Islamist extremism at pro-Palestinian demonstrations, promoted anti-immigration narratives concerning Gazan support for Hamas and asylum seekers, and amplified incidents involving British flags at pro-Palestinian protests. On X, he also promoted a claim that an alleged Israeli intelligence document outlined plans to expel Palestinians to Western countries.

=== Race and ethnicity ===
Watson has criticised perceived racial tokenism. In 2017 he criticised the BBC for "portraying Roman Britain as ethnically diverse" after the broadcaster included a black Roman centurion in an educational cartoon. His criticism was contradicted by Mary Beard and the Faculty of Classics at the University of Cambridge, saying there was overwhelming evidence that Roman Britain was a multi-ethnic society.

In May 2022 Byline Times and the Southern Poverty Law Center published an account of a recording apparently of Watson at a party saying: "I really think you should press the button to wipe Jews off the face of the Earth" and making other homophobic and racist comments, such as saying: "I care about white people and not sand nigger Paki Jew faggot coons". The recording has been confirmed by three secondary sources. In response, Joe Mulhall of Hope not Hate said that while Watson was careful to follow social media platform moderation policy, it was not surprising that he would express such views in private.
