= Knowledge Fight =

Podcast dedicated to critiquing Alex Jones

- Genre: Comedy/News (Current Events)
- Country of origin: United States (Illinois)
- Language: English

Creative team
- Created by: Dan Friesen

Cast and voices
- Voices: Dan Friesen; Jordan Holmes

Music
- Theme music composed by: DJ Danarchy

Production
- Length: 75–140 minutes

Publication
- No. of episodes: 1138
- Original release: January 7, 2017 – May 18, 2026
- Updates: Mondays; Wednesdays; Fridays

Related
- Website: knowledgefight.com

Knowledge Fight was a podcast dedicated to analyzing and critiquing episodes of Alex Jones's InfoWars shows. The podcast was created in January 2017, and the final episode aired in May 2026. It was hosted by the former stand-up comedians Dan Friesen and Jordan Holmes, both of whom live in Chicago, Illinois.

== History ==
In January 2017, Dan Friesen and Jordan Holmes began production of the Knowledge Fight podcast.

In 2023, Friesen started a newsletter called The Stackies as a place to write longer articles relating to the podcast's topics.

On the May 4, 2026 episode, Dan and Jordan announced that, with the pending acquisition of the InfoWars brand by The Onion, the podcast is ending and they will be taking a break from working together. The final episode, a live show that had already been scheduled and sold out before the decision to end the podcast was made, was recorded on May 16 and released on May 18.

On August 17, Cool Zone Media announced that Dan Friesen would launch a continuation of the show dubbed Knowledge Fight Country (a reference to Donkey Kong Country), a once-weekly show with a wider view of the right-wing political and conspiracy media sphere, alongside a rotating series of cohosts. The first episode released on October 14.

== Format ==
In each episode, Friesen plays clips of noteworthy moments from one of Jones's shows and deconstructs where his misinformation comes from, even going so far as to track down misreadings of headlines that took place decades ago, which are followed by Holmes' (an everyman stand-in) reactions. The majority of episodes relate to modern day Alex Jones, but the podcast has gone as far back as the late 1990s in its coverage.

Notable events covered on the podcast include the Sandy Hook Shooting, the Boston Marathon Bombing, the Iraq War, and the January 6th Insurrection.

Along with Jones, Friesen and Holmes occasionally cover other conspiracy figures they consider to be relevant to their main subject on their 'Wacky Wednesday' episodes. 1990s radio conspiracy theorist Bill Cooper and current new-age alien conspiracist 'sweary' Kerry Cassidy (host and producer of the podcast "Project Camelot") are recurrent subjects.

The podcast has covered two of Jones's movies, The Obama Deception, and Endgame: Road to Tyranny, in detailed miniseries. A less formal series of episodes focus on Tucker Carlson's shows on X, including his interview with Russian president Vladimir Putin. The legal depositions in Jones's multiple court cases also have extensive coverage.

== Reception ==
The podcast series has been used by lawyers researching Alex Jones in relation to his various Sandy Hook lawsuits. Friesen has been called upon as an expert in Alex Jones and his shows by plaintiffs' lead counsel in Texas, Mark Bankston, because of the podcast series. Bankston has appeared as a guest on Knowledge Fight multiple times.

The podcast has received praise for Friesen's breakdowns of complex misinformation and propaganda tactics, and for his research, which often goes back to investigating the ideological roots of Jones's political positions stemming from his exposure to the John Birch Society from a young age via his parents.
