= SeeThink Films =

Brooklyn-based film production company

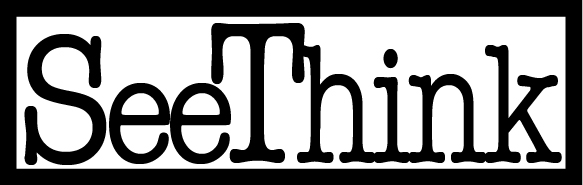
Logo

SeeThink Films is a Brooklyn-based film production company consisting of a partnership of filmmakers, focusing on documentary and fiction work in both film and television. Some of their past projects include Darkon, Alice Neel, Stand Clear of the Closing Doors and Breaking a Monster.

== History ==
‘’SeeThink Productions’’ was initially created in 2001 by Andrew Neel after graduating from the film studies program at Columbia University. In 2004, filmmakers Tom Davis, Luke Meyer, and Ethan Palmer joined Neel to make their first feature Darkon and founded SeeThink Films to continue producing films together. In 2016, longtime collaborator Brad Turner joined SeeThink Films as the collective's fifth partner.

== Filmography ==
Year	Project	Director(s)	Producer(s)	Production company(s)
2006	Darkon	Luke Meyer, Andrew Neel	Tom Davis, Ethan Palmer	SeeThink Films, Ovie Entertainment
2007	Alice Neel	Andrew Neel	Ethan Palmer, Rebecca Spence	SeeThink Films
2008	The Feature	Michel Auder, Andrew Neel	Ethan Palmer	SeeThink Films
2009	New World Order	Luke Meyer, Andrew Neel	Tom Davis	SeeThink Films, IFC, Cactus Three
2012	King Kelly	Andrew Neel	Andrew Corkin, Tom Davis, Luke Meyer, Ethan Palmer, Ed Vassallo	SeeThink Films
2013	Bluebird	Lance Edmands	Garrett P. Fennelly, Kyle Martin, Alexander Shepsman	Act Zero Films, Film i Väst, Killer Films, Rooks Nest Entertainment, SeeThink Films, Washington Square Films
2013	Stand Clear of the Closing Doors	Sam Fleischner	Andrew Neel, Veronica Nickel, Dave Saltzman, Craig Shilowich	How Follows What, SeeThink Films, M ss ng P eces
2015	Breaking a Monster	Luke Meyer	Tom Davis, Thad Luckinbill, Trent Luckinbill, Molly Smith	Black Label Media, SeeThink Films
2016	Goat	Andrew Neel	James Franco, David Hinojosa, Vince Jolivette, Christine Vachon	Killer Films, Fresh Jade, Rabbit Bandini

== Short Films & Music Videos ==
- Limb After Limb (2023, directed by Andrew Neel)
- Unlocking The Truth (2014, directed by Luke Meyer)
- I Don’t Wanna Go Into the Darkness (2012, directed by Luke Meyer)
- Family Band: Children (2010, directed by Luke Meyer)
- TV on the Radio: Staring at the Sun (2004, directed by Elliot Jokelson)
- The Stills: Still in Love Song (2004, directed by Andrew Neel)
- billy528 (2001, directed by Andrew Neel)
