= Wind-Up Fest =

2015 festival in Massachusetts, US

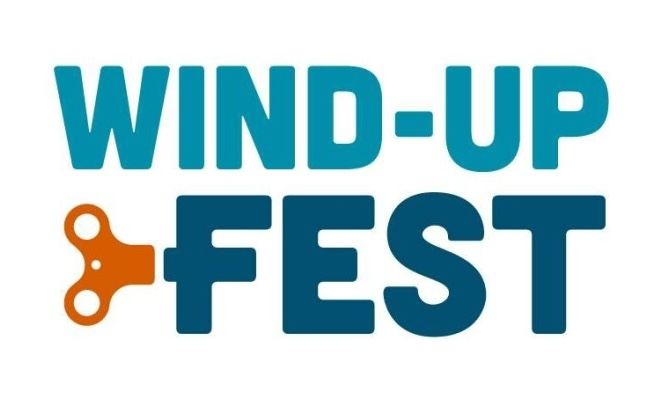
Wind-Up Fest Logo

Wind-Up Fest was an American multidisciplinary festival celebrating non-fiction storytelling in all its forms. It existed for only one year, in 2015, where it was held in North Adams and Williamstown, Massachusetts. It was billed as "An enchanted expedition to the fiery core of NonFiction. Guided by the world’s most compelling creators of documentaries, podcasts, long-form journalism, live performance and storytelling".

== Program ==
The festival was hosted by MassMoCA, Williams College, Images Cinema and the North Adams Elks Lodge No. 487. The new festival was designed as a re-imagination of the former Williamstown Film Festival by artistic-director Paul Sturtz (who had started True/False Film Festival in Columbia, Missouri) and managing-director Sandra Thomas (previously executive director of Images Cinema). The newly named Wind-Up Fest included podcasts, live-performances, long-form journalism and music, in addition to film.

=== List of events ===
The original program ran October 15–18, 2015 and included the following presentations:

- Olmo & The Seagull (feature film directed by Lea Glob & Petra Costa, with Q&A by Maria Tucci)
- And The Kids & The Sun Parade (live music)
- Nonfiction variety show with live performances by Rich Remsberg, David Rothenberg and Brenda Ann Kenneally
- Abandoned Goods (short film directed by Edward Lawrenson & Pia Borg)
- World of Tomorrow (short film directed by Don Hertzfeldt)
- The And: Marcela and Rock (short film directed by Topaz Adizes)
- Very Semi-Serious (feature film directed by Leah Wolchok, followed by conversation with Bruce Eric Kaplan and Liana Fink)
- Secret Lover & Samuel James (live music)
- A how-to presentation by David Rees
- Storytelling=Swindling (a live presentation by Penny Lane about her upcoming film Nuts!)
- One Year Lease (short film directed by Brian Bolster)
- Hotel 22 (short film directed by Elizabeth Lo)
- Object (short film directed by Paulina Skibinska)
- A personal history by Samuel James
- The Blazing World (short film directed by Jessica Bardsley)
- 30 Years in My Life As a Radio Man (a live performance by Scott Carrier)
- 2 Things That No One Wanted Combined--Radio & Dance (a dance and radio performance by Monica Bill Barnes)
- Love + Radio (premiere of a new episode with host Nick van der Kolk)
- Uncertain (feature film directed by Anna Sandilands & Ewan McNicol, with Q&A by Elizabeth Kolbert)
- Song from the Forest (feature film directed by Michael Obert, followed by presentation by David Rothenberg)
- Breaking a Monster (feature film directed by Luke Meyer, with Q&A by Frank Black)
- Seratones & Wishbone Zoë (live music)
- A presentation by Kirsten Johnson about her upcoming film Cameraperson
- Of Men and War (feature film directed by Laurent Bécue-Renard, with Q&A by Kirsten Johnson)
- Greetings on Behalf of the People of our Planet! (a series of live documentary performances by Sam Green & Dave Cerf)
