= Alice Neel (film) =

- Promotional poster for Alice Neel
- Directed by: Andrew Neel
- Written by: Andrew Neel
- Produced by: Ethan Palmer, Rebecca Spence
- Starring: Alice Neel; Hartley Neel; Richard Neel; Michel Auder; Phil Bonosky; Chuck Close; Marlene Dumas; Cristina Lancella; Juan Martinez; Linda Nochlin; Robert Storr
- Cinematography: Andrew Neel; Ethan Palmer; Hillary Spera
- Edited by: Luke Meyer
- Music by: Jonah Rapino
- Production company: SeeThink Films
- Release dates: January 21, 2007 (Slamdance); May 22, 2009 (United States)
- Running time: 81 minutes
- Country: United States
- Language: English

Alice Neel is a 2007 documentary film about the life of Alice Neel, exploring the struggles she faced as a woman artist, a single mother, and a painter who defied convention. The documentary was directed by Neel's grandson, Andrew Neel.

Alice Neel premiered at The Sundance Film Festival in 2007 and later won the Audience Award at the 2007 Newport Beach Film Festival later that year. The film was produced by SeeThink Productions.

== Reception ==
On review aggregator website Rotten Tomatoes, the film holds an approval rating of 75% based on 16 reviews, with an average rating of 7.0/10.
