= KannaLife =

Pharmaceutical and medical company

Kannalife Sciences Inc.
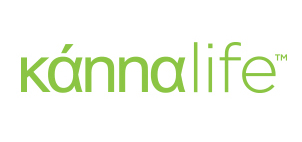
- Type: Private (Subsidiary)
- Industry: Pharmaceutical
- Founded: 2010
- Founders: Dean Petkanas, Thoma Kikis
- Headquarters: Doylestown, Pennsylvania
- Total assets: Exclusive License of patent US 6630507
- Website: http://kannalife.com

KannaLife was granted the Exclusive License by NIH-OTT for the commercialization of patent US 6630507 “Cannabinoids as Antioxidants and Neuroprotectants."

Kannalife Sciences Inc., a subsidiary of Neuropathix, Inc., is a bio-pharmaceutical and phyto-medical company based in Doylestown, Pennsylvania founded by Dean Petkanas and Thoma Kikis. Kannalife was formed in 2010 and is involved in the research and development of novel new therapeutic agents designed to reduce oxidative stress, and act as immuno-modulators and neuroprotectants.

== History ==
In 2011, the company was granted an Exclusive License by National Institutes of Health – Office of Technology Transfer (NIH-OTT) for the Commercialization of patent US 6630507, “Cannabinoids as Antioxidants and Neuroprotectants."

In 2021, Kannalife, was awarded a non-dilutive three-year $2.97 Million grant from the National Institute of Neurological Disorders and Stroke (NINDS) and National Institutes of Health (NIH). The three-year study grant is funded through the NIH HEAL Initiative (Helping End Addiction Long-term) for enhanced pain management and provides funding specifically in the Development of KLS-13019 for Neuropathic Pain. In 2024, The Michael J. Fox Foundation awarded Kannalife a $1.49 Million grant to support the development of KLS-13019 as a potential treatment for Parkinson's disease. This funding aims to advance preclinical research into KLS-13019, a therapeutic targeting neuroinflammation and mitochondrial dysfunction associated with Parkinson's disease.

Kannalife is currently conducting research and development at the Pennsylvania Biotechnology Center of Bucks County to treat Chemotherapy-induced peripheral neuropathy, Hepatic encephalopathy, Parkinson's disease, Mild Traumatic Brain Injury and CTE.

Kannalife was featured in Sports Illustrated article on using cannabinoids to treat Concussions and CTE.
