= New World Order (film) =

- Directed by: Luke Meyer; Andrew Neel
- Produced by: Tom Davis
- Cinematography: Luke Meyer; Andrew Neel
- Edited by: Nathan S. Caswell
- Music by: Jonn Ollsin; Jonah Rapino
- Production company: SeeThink Films
- Distributed by: Independent Film Channel
- Release date: March 13, 2009 (South by Southwest)
- Running time: 90 minutes
- Country: United States
- Language: English

New World Order is a 2009 American documentary film directed by Luke Meyer and Andrew Neel. It explores conspiracy theorists who are committed to vigorously opposing what they believe to be an emerging "New World Order".

== Plot ==
The film concentrates on the activities of Alex Jones, Jim Tucker, Jack McLamb, and Luke Rudkowski, with particular focus on their efforts to expose the highly secretive meetings of the Bilderberg Group, promote the 9/11 Truth Movement, and oppose what they see as the erosion of traditional American, Constitutionally-based civil and political rights and liberties.

== Critical reception ==
In his review of the film for the magazine Wired, Lewis Wallace writes, "As New World Order follows Jones and some of his fellow conspiracy mongers, it delivers a fascinating look at true believers who are desperate to expose the supposed sins of politicians and business chieftains...the movie introduces the real people whose lives are in some instances consumed by these exotic ideas."

In his IGN review, Christopher Monfette writes, "New World Order is a fascinating, confusing, moving, frustrating, multi-layered documentary that sheds light on a group we might otherwise purposefully keep in the darkness. Without agenda or judgment, we are left to decide on our own how we feel, and for a documentary in a day when documentaries are notoriously manipulative, that's a mark of excellence."

Don R. Lewis writes for Film Threat, "New World Order is an intriguing, evenhanded peek into a world all around us that we never really see."

== See also ==
- Darkon, another documentary from the same directors and producer
