= Thoma Kikis =

American-Greek film producer and designer

- Θωμά Κίκης
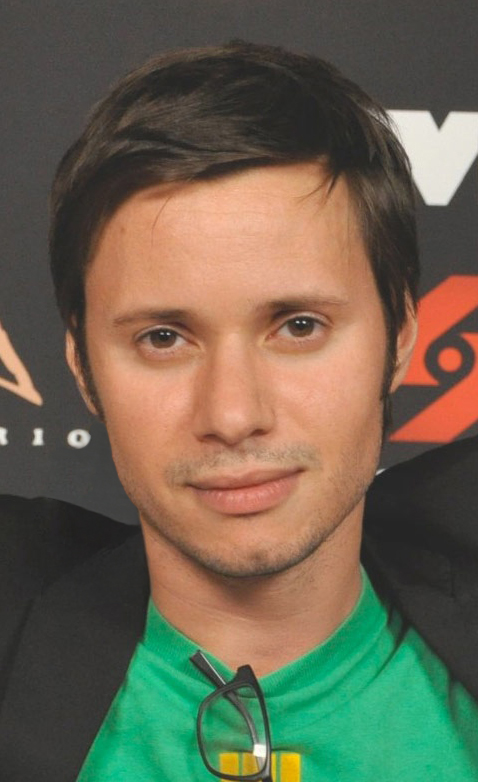
- Born: New York City
- Education: NYU; NYFA
- Occupations: filmmaker; designer; typographer; entrepreneur

Thoma Kikis (/ˈkɪkɪs/; Greek: Θωμά Κίκης pronounced [θoˈma ˈkikis]) is an American-born Greek film producer, designer, typographer and entrepreneur best known for co-founding Kannalife Sciences, Neuropathix and the founder of TEKNIKE.

== Life ==
Kikis was born in New York City to Greek parents from the city of Ioannina in the Epirus region of Greece. He studied communications at New York University and filmmaking at the New York Film Academy.

== Film ==
In 2003, Kikis co-founded Ovie Entertainment to develop and produce motion picture intellectual properties. His first project was as producer of Darkon (2006), the award-winning feature-length documentary film following the real-life adventures of a group of fantasy live-action role-playing (LARP) gamers, which won the Audience Award for Best Documentary at the 2006 South By Southwest (SXSW) Film Festival.

He later co-produced the award-winning Alps (2011), directed by Yorgos Lanthimos and winner of the Golden Osella Award for Best Screenplay (Yorgos Lanthimos and Efthimis Filippou) at the 68th Venice International Film Festival.

In 2012, he worked on the art-house black comedy film It's A Disaster (2012) written and directed by Todd Berger and stars Julia Stiles, David Cross, Jeff Grace and America Ferrera. Subsequent works include the experimental short film A Stone Appears (2016), featuring Bill Skarsgård, and Man in the Attic (2021).

He serves on the board of the Hellenic Film Society and led the creative direction for the rebranding initiative—designing the Society’s new main logo and the creation of the official poster for the 2025 New York Greek Film Expo—a richly layered, hand-illustrated design produced in collaboration through his New York–based studio TEKNIKE. He is a member of the Hellenic Film Academy.

== Design and typography ==
Kikis is the founder of TEKNIKE, a multidisciplinary studio and type foundry focused on experimental and culturally inspired logotypes, brand identity, story and type design. His clients have included MTV, Hulu, and Hermès. He has released numerous typefaces that span geometric, monospaced, script, and display styles, often incorporating Latin and Greek scripts, with most supporting Cyrillic and some Hebrew alphabets.

His first major release, Fugues (2015), is a textured geometric monospaced sans-serif inspired by organic architecture geometry as apparent in the work of Antoni Gaudi. In 2016, he introduced Ithaka, a script typeface, followed by several releases in 2017, including the hand-lettered Anamorphic, Evangelos, Privé, and Qipao. That year, he also developed Nautis, a sans serif influenced by nautical themes; Jadeite, a mid-century modern sans; Cycladic, a sans serif inspired by Greek island architecture; Vantagram, a blackletter typeface; UNY, a slab serif designed for athletic lettering; and Designator, a modular monospaced font.

In 2019, Kikis expanded his collection with the hand-lettered Omoshiroi, Côte, and Penzance, along with monospaced typefaces such as Monadic, Chartreux, Originator, and the high-contrast sans Quantour. His 2020 releases included the dot matrix typefaces Receptor and Departe, as well as the industrial shipping monospaced Eleusis.

Other works include Ermou (2021), a Greek emulation typeface and Telomere (2024) continuing his exploration of typographic design.

== Biotechnology ==
In 2010, Kikis co-founded Kannalife Sciences, a biopharmaceutical company and subsidiary of Neuropathix, developing cannabinoid-inspired therapeutics to treat neurodegenerative diseases, including Parkinson's disease, CTE and Chemotherapy-induced peripheral neuropathy.

In 2014, he appeared on Bloomberg TV's Taking Stock with Pimm Fox discussing forming Kannalife Sciences, cannabinoid research, the regulatory landscape, and Medical cannabis industry in the United States. His efforts have been highlighted in outlets such as the National Herald, Vice Media, and Temple News.

In 2021, researchers at Temple University, in collaboration with Kannalife, were awarded a three-year $2.97 Million Small Business Innovation Research grant from the National Institutes of Health to support preclinical studies on KLS-13019, a novel cannabidiol-derived compound. The research focuses on evaluating the compound's potential to protect nerve cells and reduce neuroinflammation, with the goal of addressing CIPN and other neurodegenerative conditions.

In July 2024, Kannalife Sciences received a $1.49 million grant from The Michael J. Fox Foundation. This funding aims to advance preclinical research into KLS-13019, a therapeutic targeting neuroinflammation and mitochondrial dysfunction associated with Parkinson's disease.

== Filmography ==
=== Feature films ===
- 2006 — Darkon (producer, executive producer;)
- 2011 — Alps (co-producer)
- 2012 — It's A Disaster (executive producer)
- 2021 — Man in the Attic (co-executive producer)

=== Short films ===
- 2016 — A Stone Appears (executive producer)

== Typefaces ==
- 2015 – Fugues
- 2016 – Ithaka
- 2017 – Evangelos, Anamorphic, Cycladic, Designator, Nautis, Privé, Qipao, Jadeite, Vantagram, UNY
- 2019 – Omoshiroi, Cote, Penzance, Monadic, Chartreux, Originator, Quantour
- 2020 – Receptor, Departe, Eleusis
- 2021 – Ermou
- 2024 – Telomere
