= Neuropathix =

American biopharmaceutical company

Neuropathix Inc.
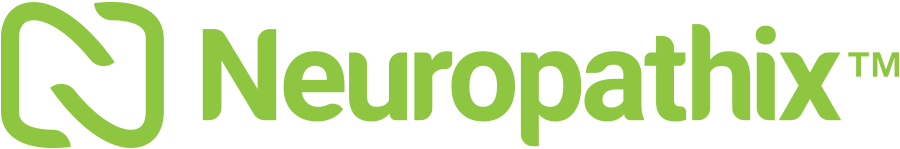
- Company type: Private
- Industry: Pharmaceutical Biotechnology
- Founders: Dean Petkanas, Thoma Kikis
- Headquarters: Doylestown, Pennsylvania
- Total assets: Patents US 9611213, US 10004722
- Website: neuropathix.com

Neuropathix, Inc. is a biopharmaceutical company based in Doylestown, Pennsylvania focused on the research and development of pain management and neuroprotective therapeutics.

In 2016, through the company's subsidiary Kannalife, Neuropathix discovered KLS-13019 along with other therapeutic agents that prevent neuropathic pain, mitochondrial dysfunction, reduce oxidative stress, and act as anti-inflammatory neuroprotectants. Both KLS-13019 and cannabidiol, prevented the development of CIPN, while only KLS-13019 uniquely reversed neuropathic pain from chemotherapy. KLS-13019 binds to fewer biological targets than cannabidiol and KLS-13019 may possess the unique ability to reverse addictive behaviour, an effect not observed with cannabidiol. Neuropathix family of monotherapeutic small molecules are focused on treating oxidative stress-related diseases, inflammation, chronic pain management and neurodegenerative disorders.

In late 2021, Neuropathix subsidiary Kannalife, was awarded a non-dilutive three-year $2.97 Million grant from the National Institute of Neurological Disorders and Stroke (NINDS) and National Institutes of Health (NIH). The three-year study grant is funded through the NIH HEAL Initiative (Helping End Addiction Long-term) for enhanced pain management and provides funding specifically in the Development of KLS-13019 for Neuropathic Pain. In 2024, The Michael J. Fox Foundation awarded Kannalife a $1.49 Million grant to support the development of KLS-13019 as a potential treatment for Parkinson's disease. This funding aims to advance preclinical research into KLS-13019, a therapeutic targeting neuroinflammation and mitochondrial dysfunction associated with Parkinson's disease.

Neuropathix is currently conducting research and development at the Pennsylvania Biotechnology Center of Bucks County to treat Chemotherapy-induced peripheral neuropathy, Hepatic encephalopathy, Parkinson's disease, Mild Traumatic Brain Injury and CTE.
