= Michel Auder =

French photographer and filmmaker

- Born: 1945 (age 80–81); Soissons, France
- Spouses: Viva (m. 1969, divorced) Cindy Sherman (m. 1984; div. 1999)
- Website: www.michelauder.com

Michel Auder (born 1945) is a French and American photographer and filmmaker. He lives and works in Brooklyn, New York.

== Art career ==
His earliest works are travel logs and endearing portraits of friends including Hannah Wilke, Alice Neel, Annie Sprinkle, Eric Bogosian, Louis Waldon, and Larry Rivers. His work is often in the format of a video diary.

In 2004, the Williams College Museum of Art held a comprehensive exhibition of Auder's work.

His work was included in the 2014 Whitney Biennial.

Auder's work is included in the permanent collection of the Museum Brandhorst.

== Personal life ==
Auder married painter/actress and author Viva in 1969 and together they had one daughter, Alexandra Auder, in February 1971. This event is included in the couple's film diaries.

Auder was married to Cindy Sherman from the early 1980s until the late 1990s.

== Selected works ==
- Keeping Busy, 1969
- Cleopatra, 1970
- The Valerie Solanas Incident, 1971
- Chelsea Girls with Andy Warhol, 1971–1976
- Chronicles: Family Diaries, 1971-1973 (Excerpts)
- Made for Denise, 1978
- Seduction of Patrick, 1979
- Portrait of Alice Neel, 1976–1982
- Chasing the Dragon, 1982
- Flying, 1983
- The Games: Olympic Variations, 1984
- My Last Bag of Heroin (For Real), 1986
- Brooding Angels, Made for R.L., 1988
- Roman Variations, 1991
- Voyage to the Center of the Phone Lines, 1993
- Polaroid Cocaine, 1993
- Louis Waldon, 1994
- The Vanuatu Chronicles, 1998
- T.W.U. Richard Serra, An Unsolicited Video by Michel Auder, 1980–82, re-edit 2002
- Louis Waldon in Chronicles: Los Angeles/Bel-Air (July 1999), 2002
- Chronicles: Columbian Wedding (April 1999), 2002
- Morocco 1972: The Real Chronicles with Viva, 2002
- Chronicles: Van's Last Performance, 1971, edited 2002
- The World Out of My Hands, 2006
- New Mexico Chronicles, 2006
- The Feature (with SeeThink Productions), 2007
- Endless Column, 2011

== Collections ==
- Museum Brandhorst, Münich
- Kadist Collection, Paris
