= Men of Burden: Pedaling towards a Horizon =

2006 documentary film

Men of Burden – Pedaling towards a Horizon
- Directed by: Raghu Jeganathan
- Written by: Kousalya Jegnathan
- Produced by: Ramesh Mourthy
- Narrated by: Domenic Romano
- Cinematography: Mohandass Radhakrishnan
- Edited by: Raghu Jeganathan
- Music by: Steve Gorn
- Release date: 2006 (United States)
- Running time: 70 min.
- Languages: English, Tamil

Men of Burden: Pedaling towards a Horizon is a 2006 documentary film set in the city of Pondicherry in the Indian territory of Puducherry, about the cycle rickshaw industry.

== Background and content ==
Cycle rickshaws

The documentary tells the story of disappearing cycle rickshaw drivers living in abject poverty. Over time, the city has experienced a gradual reduction in the number of cycle rickshaws, thereby affecting the livelihoods of those who depend on them. The film considers the ethical dimensions of the trade against the increasing impact of motorised transport and air pollution.

The aim of the film was to raise awareness and funds for Men of Burden – Cycle rickshaw Revival (MOBCRR), an initiative to promote the cycle rickshaw sector and sustainable transport, in order to protect the rickshaw drivers as well as the environment.

== Release ==
The film had its world premiere at the Los Angeles Indian Film Festival, European premiere at the Filmburo Baden-Wurttemberg's Bollywood and Beyond Film Festival and its New York premiere at the sixth annual Indo-American Arts Council Film Festival.
