= Elizabeth Neel =

American painter

- Born: 1975 (age 50–51); Stowe, Vermont, U.S.
- Education: Brown University; Columbia University
- Known for: Painting

Elizabeth Neel (born 1975 in Stowe, Vermont) is an American artist based in New York.

== Life and work ==
Elizabeth Neel received a BA from Brown University in 1997 and an MFA from Columbia University in 2007. She is the granddaughter of the painter Alice Neel (1900–1984) and the sister of filmmaker Andrew Neel.

Interview Magazine describes Neel's work as "violent, gestural canvases that border on abstraction but are in actuality deeply rooted in the facts of the physical world". The author and critic John Reed describes Neel's paintings as

“boldly dismissive of distinctions between abstraction and representation. Landscape and figure grow out of abstraction, and at the same time, decay into abstraction—an abstraction that represents not so much the geometry of forms as the insanity of perceiving. In this new millennia of painting, Neel has distilled a methodology as fully cognizant of digital imagery and the position of the cinematic camera, as it is of the course of art history. 'Every painting I make is a reference to every painting made before,' says Neel."

Neel's work is included in the 2009 Phaidon book Painting Abstraction: New Elements in Abstract Painting by Robert Nickas.

In 2010, Fionn Meade curated a solo exhibition of Neel's work, entitled Stick Season, at SculptureCenter (Long Island City, NY). As described in the press release, "Elizabeth Neel's work relies on a controlled chaos that conflates a palimpsest-like understanding of imagery with a masterful facility for gestural mark making and layered abstraction. A new body of paintings on paper and sculptures extends this tension into three dimensions as found objects, natural artifacts, and studio detritus join with painterly technique to form a series of precarious assemblages. Incorporating organic and mechanistic references, Neel creates a hybrid iconography that tacks between mediums and moods. Resistant to facile representation, empirical observation and still life conventions mix with appropriated imagery, everyday objects, and abstraction in presenting a serial yet disjunctive ambience that is both playful and melancholy, archaic and spontaneous."

In 2011 Neel's work was in the fifth Prague Biennale. Sikkema Jenkins & Co. held an exhibit, “3 and 4 before 2 and 5,” of Neel's work in 2013. Vielmetter Los Angeles hosted Neel's 2015 exhibit, "Lobster with Shell Game." The Vielmetter Los Angeles has hosted a number of other exhibits of Neel's works as well including the 2012 "Elizabeth Neel: Routes and Pressures," the 2017 "Elizabeth Neel: Claw Hammer," the 2020 "Elizabeth Neel: Life in Halves," and the late 2023 "Elizabeth Neel: The Ghosts of my Friends."
