= Domenic Romano =

Canadian attorney

- Born: Toronto, Canada
- Education: University of Oxford (BA); Columbia Law School (LLM)
- Occupations: corporate, media, and entertainment attorney, television commentator
- Website: romanolaw.com

Domenic Romano is a corporate, media, and entertainment attorney and television commentator. He is the founder and managing partner of Romano Law.

== Early life and education ==
Domenic Romano is the only sibling of actor Rino Romano. He was born in Toronto, Canada and attended De La Salle Oaklands.

Romano earned his master's and bachelor's degree in history and political science from McGill University in 1989. He graduated from the University of Oxford with a bachelor's degree in Jurisprudence in 1991. He then received his Master of Laws in International Business from Columbia Law School.

== Career ==
Romano began his career as an Articling Associate at Osler, Hoskin & Harcourt, where he worked in the firm's Corporate, Securities, Intellectual Property, and Litigation Departments. After working at Osler, he served as in-house counsel for the Toronto-based biotech firm previously known as Pasteur Merieux Connaught (now Sanofi Pasteur). He then worked in New York at Jones Day, Thelen, and Hahn & Hessen as a corporate securities and mergers and acquisitions attorney.

In 2003, Romano founded Romano Law, a corporate, employment, entertainment, and intellectual property law firm specializing in litigation and transactional work.

Romano has narrated and produced several films and TV Series including, The Featherweight, Goold's Gold, The Mook Brothers, POV, The City Dark, Men of Burden: Pedaling towards a Horizon and Darkon. He served as Legal Counsel to the 2016 Academy Award winning film Spotlight.

== Legal commentary ==
Romano has appeared as a commentator on programs such as CNN, CBS News, Fox News, and Bloomberg Television.

Romano has been quoted by The New York Times, The Wall Street Journal, CNBC, and TIME.

Romano has commented on several topics including the 2020 Summer Olympics in Tokyo, Stormy Daniels' libel case against former President Donald Trump, Scarlett Johansson's lawsuit against Marvel, and NCAA compensation for student-athletes.

== Affiliations ==
Romano served as President and board member of the Entrepreneurs' Organization, New York chapter. He is also a member of the Academy of Television Arts & Sciences (TV Academy) and an Emmy voter.

== Awards and recognitions ==
Romano has been recognized as a Top 100 attorney in the New York Metro area by Super Lawyers in 2022, 2023, and 2024 and a New York Super Lawyer annually since 2015. Romano Law's Entertainment team was recognized by Chambers & Partners USA 2025 Spotlight Guide for excellence in Media and entertainment.
