= Unlocking the Truth =

American heavy metal band

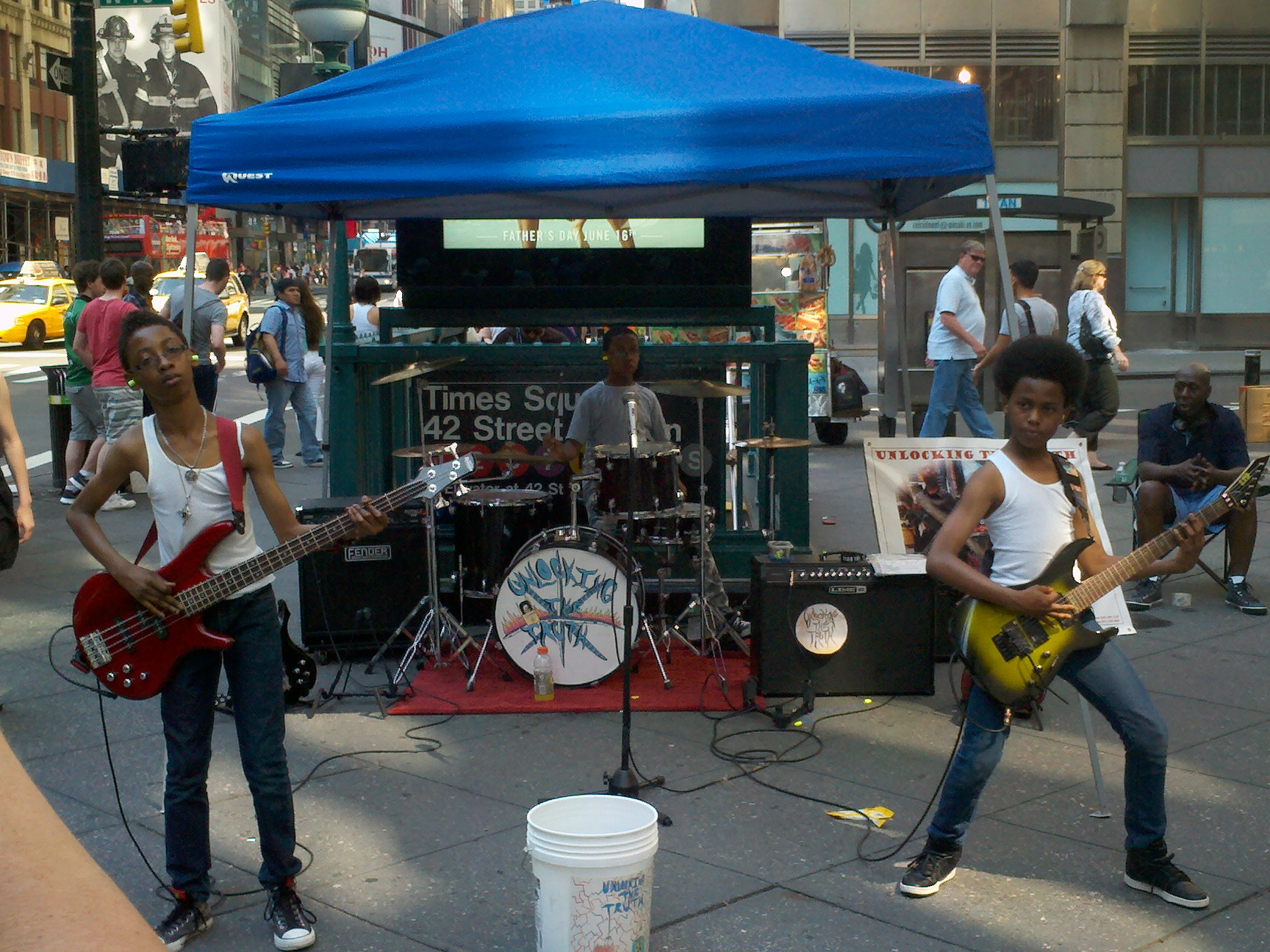
- Unlocking the Truth perform in Times Square on June 1, 2013

Background information
- Origin: Brooklyn, New York, United States
- Genres: Heavy metal; thrash metal; metalcore
- Years active: 2007–2020
- Label: Independent
- Past members: Malcolm Brickhouse; Jarad Dawkins; Alec Atkins

Unlocking the Truth was an American heavy metal band from Brooklyn, New York. Formed in 2007, the group consisted of Malcolm Brickhouse (guitars, vocals, key songwriter, composer), Jarad Dawkins (drums), and Alec Atkins (bass).

== History ==
Founding members Malcolm Brickhouse (guitar, vocals) and Jarad Dawkins (drums) met at a birthday party in 2005. Sharing musical tastes, they formed a band. They needed a bassist but none of their friends were musicians, so they taught Alec Atkins to play bass. Busking in Times Square and around New York City led to people recording and uploading videos of them to YouTube and social media.

While in their early teens, the band appeared on national television, including NBC's The Tonight Show, ABC's The View, CNN, Fuse, BET, and Comedy Central’s The Colbert Report. In 2014, they were the youngest group to perform at Coachella. They performed at the Afropunk Festival, SXSW, and were the youngest band to play at the 2014 Vans Warped Tour. They performed at the music festivals Heavy Montréal and Bonnaroo.

Unlocking the Truth supported Guns N' Roses, Motörhead, Queens of the Stone Age, Living Colour, Slash and Marilyn Manson, while also appearing in commercials for Airheads, AT&T, Beats by Dr. Dre, Maybelline and Verizon. The band was featured in Spin, Revolver, Guitar World, Rolling Stone, New York Daily News, Village Voice, New York Post, New York Times, Los Angeles Times, Huffington Post, and Loudwire, all while attending middle school and then high school.

In 2014, the band signed a $1.8 million contract for five albums with Sony Music Entertainment. Due to the age of the members of the band, the contract had to be approved by the New York Supreme Court. In 2015, the band successfully negotiated their release from the contract with the label. In April 2016, the band announced the release of their full-length debut album, Chaos. The album was released on June 17, 2016 via TuneCore. A feature-length documentary film about the band, entitled Breaking a Monster, was released in the summer of 2016. The film was directed by Luke Meyer and won Best Music Documentary at the UK Music Video Awards. Loudwire premiered their first music video "Take Control".

They released a few more singles, "My Chains" (2017), "Come Closer" (2018), "Mama" (2018) and "Pretend" (2019). In January 2020, it was announced the band had ended and frontman Malcolm Brickhouse would be pursuing a solo career under the moniker Malxolm Brixkhouse. He released the song "Rapture" in September 2021.

== Style and influences ==
Unlocking the Truth's sound has been described as "a salute to old-school metal that also blends modern influences." In the Los Angeles Times, Randall Roberts wrote of their Coachella performance as "a hard, distorted blend of metal, speed punk and alternative rock on the main stage, they were as well-practiced as units three times their age." Artist Direct says "they are the future of music." The band has cited influences such as Metallica, Slipknot, Disturbed, Living Colour, Escape the Fate, Chelsea Grin, and Motionless in White.

== Members ==
- Malcolm Brickhouse – guitars, vocals (2007–2020)
- Jarad Dawkins – drums (2007–2020)
- Alec Atkins – bass (2013–2020)

== Discography ==
Albums

- Chaos (2016)

Singles

- "My Chains" (2017)
- "Come Closer" (2018)
- "Mama" (2018)
- "Pretend" (2019)
