= The Feature =

- Directed by: Michel Auder; Andrew Neel
- Written by: Michel Auder; Luke Meyer; Andrew Neel
- Produced by: Ethan Palmer
- Starring: Michel Auder
- Edited by: Luke Meyer
- Production company: SeeThink Films
- Release date: February 13, 2008 (Berlin International Film Festival)
- Country: United States

The Feature is a collaboration between filmmakers Michel Auder and Andrew Neel. Using a collection of videos that Auder had created over the previous 40 years, in combination with original present-day footage of Auder shot by Neel, the two filmmakers made a feature-length film loosely based on the story of Auder's life.

== Content ==
Auder created a form of video diary, starting with his first Sony Portapak camera in 1969, documenting the people, places, and events in his life, which included marriages to Viva Superstar and Cindy Sherman, and a loose affiliation with the Warhol Factory. The film is shot in New York City, and islands in the South Pacific.

The Feature is not a biographical film. Although the narrative is linear, footage from various periods in Auder's life is used throughout the film. The story is augmented with satirical sit-down interviews of Auder in the present day, and biographical information (both fictional and real) is integrated into the hyper-theatrical scenes shot by Neel.
