= Hellenic Film Society =

U.S.-based nonprofit promoting Greek cinema

Hellenic Film Society (USA), Inc.
- Abbreviation: HFS
- Founded: 2018
- Founder: James DeMetro
- Legal status: 501(c)(3) Non-profit
- Purpose: Share the richness of Greek films with a wider American audience, to showcase Greek movies, and to preserve the film heritage of Greece.
- Headquarters: New York City
- Fields: Greek, Cinema, Film
- President: Maria C. Miles
- Website: hellenicfilmsociety.org

Hellenic Film Society (HFS) is a United States-based nonprofit cultural organization focused on promoting Greek cinema. Headquartered in New York City, HFS organizes public screenings of Greek films and supports filmmakers of Greek heritage through festivals, retrospectives, and partnerships with American cultural institutions. The organization was established as a 501(c)(3) organization to preserve and showcase the cinematic heritage of Greece and Cyprus to American audiences.

== Activities ==
2025 New York Greek Film Expo - Poster Art by Thoma Kikis & Tiffany Apostolou

The Hellenic Film Society presents a curated selection of feature films, documentaries, and short films by Greek and Greek diaspora filmmakers. Its programming includes films produced in Greece, as well as international co-productions and works that explore Hellenism and Greek culture.

The organization's flagship event is the New York Greek Film Expo, an annual festival held in New York City that features new releases from Greece and filmmaker Q&As. HFS also hosts the Always on Sunday. monthly film series in collaboration with the Museum of the Moving Image in Queens, which offers screenings of Greek-language films with English subtitles, often with accompanying discussions or special guests.

Beyond New York, HFS partners with regional Greek film events across the United States, including the Chicago Greek Film Expo, the South Florida Greek Film Festival, and the Atlanta Greek Film Expo, contributing to a national network of Greek cultural programming.

In 2025, HFS began a rebranding initiative, which included the introduction of a new logo designed by Thoma Kikis.

== Organization ==
Hellenic Film Society USA, Inc is a 501(c)(3) organization governed by a board of directors and supported by a team of volunteers and cultural advisors. It relies on donor support, grants, and ticket sales to fund its programs. The organization engages with both Greek-American communities and broader U.S. audiences interested in international and independent cinema.
