= Luke Meyer =

American documentary filmmaker

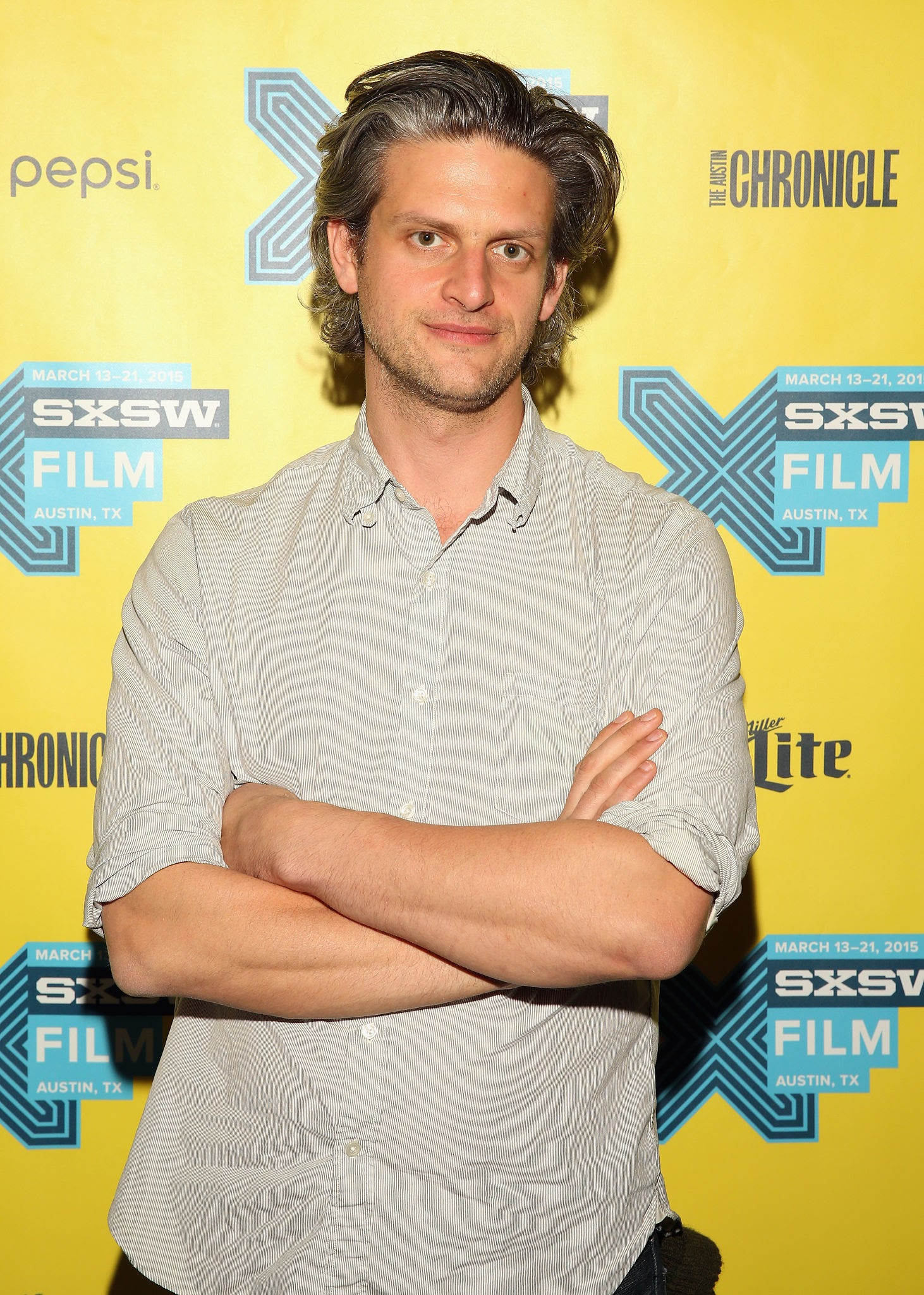
- Meyer in 2015
- Born: New York City, US
- Occupation: Filmmaker
- Years active: 2003–present

Luke Meyer is an American documentary filmmaker. His films include Darkon, New World Order, and Breaking a Monster. He is a founding partner of the New York-based filmmaking collective SeeThink Films.

== Life and career ==
Meyer's first film, Darkon (2006), was a documentary about the live action role playing group the Darkon Wargaming Club. It premiered at the South by Southwest Film Festival where it won the Audience Award. The film was acquired by IFC after playing in a limited theatrical release. IFC later produced his second film, New World Order (2009) a documentary about Alex Jones and the rising conspiracy culture of the late 2000s. He directed Breaking a Monster (2016) about the wild break-out year of the teen band Unlocking the Truth after they sign a $1.8 million record deal with Sony Music. The film won 'Best Documentary' at the 2016 UK Video Music Awards. At the 2023 Tribeca Film Festival he premiered the first episode of The Fourth Wall, a documentary series about The Sullivanians a New York-based psychotherapy cult.

Born in New York City, Luke Meyer later grew up in Long Island, New York and Western Massachusetts. He studied writing at The New School and got into filmmaking as an extension of his interest in storytelling. Meyer is a part of SeeThink Films, which he formed with Tom Davis, Andrew Neel and Ethan Palmer when the group made Darkon. He has worked as an editor, writer, and producer on the films Alice Neel, The Feature and King Kelly. His short film I Don’t Wanna Go Into the Darkness about the musician Juiceboxxx featured in Leon Neyfakh’s book The Next Next Level: A Story of Rap, Friendship and Almost Giving Up. In 2015 he co-created The Bellwether Film Series in Amherst, Massachusetts and since then has served as a curator for the film series.

== Filmography ==
| Title | Year | Director | Producer | Writer | Cinematographer | Editor | Notes |
|---|---|---|---|---|---|---|---|
| Darkon | 2006 | Yes | No | Yes | No | No | Documentary |
| Alice Neel | 2007 | No | No | No | No | Yes | Documentary |
| The Feature | 2008 | No | No | Yes | No | Yes | |
| New World Order | 2009 | Yes | No | Yes | Yes | No | Documentary |
| I Don't Wanna Go Into the Darkness | 2012 | Yes | Yes | Unknown | Unknown | Unknown | Documentary |
| King Kelly | 2012 | No | Yes | No | No | No | |
| Unlocking the Truth | 2013 | Yes | No | Unknown | Unknown | Unknown | Documentary |
| Breaking a Monster | 2015 | Yes | No | Yes | No | No | Documentary |
