= Ethel V. Ashton =

American painter (1896–1975)

- Born: February 9, 1896; Philadelphia, Pennsylvania
- Died: 1975 (aged 78–79); Philadelphia, Pennsylvania
- Occupations: Artist, muralist, librarian
- Years active: 1929–1970
- Notable work: Murals

Ethel V. Ashton (February 9, 1896 – May 1975) was an American artist who primarily worked in Philadelphia, Pennsylvania. She was both a subject of noted artist Alice Neel and a portraitist of Neel. Her early works reflect the influence of Ashcan realism focused primarily on portrait painting. She was commissioned to work on the Works Progress Administration's post office mural project and has works hanging in the permanent collections of several prominent museums. By the mid-1950s she worked with abstract concepts and through the end of the civil rights era, her works synthesize both abstract and realism. She also served as the librarian of the Pennsylvania Academy of the Fine Arts from 1957 into the early 1970s.

== Biography ==
Ethel Ashton was born on February 9, 1896, in Philadelphia, Pennsylvania, to Charles and Mary V. Ashton. She studied art at the Philadelphia School of Design for Women, with classmates Rhoda Medary and Alice Neel, graduating in 1921. Neel would gain renown for her expressionistic portraits depicting other artists as well as friends, family and lovers. During their schooling, the three girls took classes at the Graphic Sketch Club and used actual people they encountered on the streets as models. The real-life actions and diversity of the everyday people in the street, was very different from the posed models in their classrooms. They also used each other as models and would continue to do so. In 1923, Ashton spent three months abroad studying in Florence and Rome, as well as in London and Paris. When she returned, she studied at the Pennsylvania Academy of the Fine Arts (PAFA).

== Career ==
Beginning in 1929, Ashton exhibited works at the PAFA. She shared a studio in Washington Square with Neel and Medary, which was where Neel painted Ashton's portrait in 1930. The portrait, which is in the permanent collection of the Tate Modern Museum of London depicts Ashton as "nearly crippled with self conscious by her own exposure," as repeatedly described by art historians. Ashton did not particularly like the nude portrait, feeling that the image unmasked her vulnerability. Her own 1920 painting of Neel, depicts the influence of Ashcan realism and her 1930 rendering of Neel is a pencil portrait. Ashton eventually rented her own new studio in 1931, when Medary married and Neel was in the sanitarium at Gladwyne Colony.

During the 1930s, Ashton began participating in national competitions and juried exhibitions with the Art Institute of Chicago, the Brooklyn Museum, the Carnegie Institute and the Philadelphia Association of Arts and Letters, as well as others. She joined the WPA's Section of Painting and Sculpture in 1935. As part of a study to determine why some watercolor paintings retain their hues and others fade, Grumbacher sponsored a program in 1937 called the "Aqua-Chromatic Exhibition" and invited leading artists to participate. Ashton's painting, "Holiday" was part of the Lehigh University exhibit. In 1941, Ashton's design Defenders of the Wyoming Country—1778 was selected for the post office mural in Tunkhannock, Pennsylvania. It depicted a battle between American settlers and local Native American tribes during the year leading up to Sullivan's March.

Throughout the 1940s, Ashton continued exhibiting at venues such as the Gallery of the daVinci Alliance from 1939 to 1944 and from whom she won the 1943 prize; the Fine Arts Museums of San Francisco in 1941 and 1946; the American Color Print Society in 1945; the National Academy of Design (1946), as well as others. Ashton's early work focused on portraiture, but by the mid-1950s she was working with abstract concepts. Her later works synthesize both abstract and realism. From 1943 to 1957, she served on the Fellowship selection committee of the PAFA and traveled extensively in Central America and the Caribbean. Though Ashton became the librarian of the Pennsylvania Academy of the Fine Arts in 1957, she continued to paint and exhibit. One such show was for the Philadelphia Art Alliance's exhibit entitled "Carnival" in 1962. She retired as a librarian in the early 1970s. Ashton died in May 1975 in Philadelphia and within a month a posthumous art award was named in her honor by PAFA.

== Legacy ==
In 1998, the mural Ashton painted in the Tunkhannock post office was restored and a television documentary was about it was planned in 2009. Ashton has works in the permanent collections of the National Gallery of Art in Washington, D.C., the Michener Art Museum in Doylestown, Pennsylvania, and the Binghamton University Art Museum. Ashton's portrait of her schoolmate and studio partner Rhoda Myers Medary is in the collection of Philadelphia's Woodmere Art Museum, as is her painting "Cotton Candy" (1952) and other artworks. In 2001, a showing of her work was held at the Marin-Price Galleries in Washington, D.C.'s Chevy Chase neighborhood and a reprise of the showing was held in 2011. In 2013, an exhibit of 40 of her works was on display at the Woodmere Art Museum in a showing entitled "Private Artist, Public Life: Ethel V. Ashton". One of the featured pieces, "River Drive" was painted during the Civil Rights Movement and depicts an African-American family on the Philadelphia street near Fairmount Park, which was controversial subject matter at that time.
