= Scrambler therapy =

Type of pain relief therapy

- Other names: Calmare scrambler therapy, Calmare therapy

Scrambler therapy involves the use of electronic stimulation on the skin with the goal of overwhelming pain information with non-pain information. In a therapy session, "electrocardiographic-like pads are placed around the area of pain".

Limited research has been done on the effectiveness of scrambler theory. There is no strong evidence that it is effective in treating neuropathic pain, although there is tentative evidence that it may be effective for chemotherapy-induced peripheral neuropathy. There is preliminary evidence that is effective for chronic pain.

== Medical Uses ==
Scrambler therapy has been used in several types of chronic pain, including neuropathic pain, cancer pain and opioid-refractory pain. Scrambler therapy involves 16 types of waveforms, each varying slightly in their morphology. The waveforms are combined to create a variety of sequences of electrical stimulation, with the pattern of sequences (the electrical signal) being varied during the treatment session based on an algorithm in the scrambler machine. The electrical stimulation is applied to the skin via pairs of electrodes (up to 5 pairs of electrodes may be used), which are applied in the painful dermatomes proximally and distally (or only proximally if the former is not feasible) to the painful area. The intensity of signal is increased in five to ten minute intervals until the patient feels a relief of pain or until the scrambler signal intensity begins to cause pain. This intensity of electrical stimulation is then continued. Each treatment session lasts for about 30-40 minutes, and may be repeated on other days during the treatment cycle.

The electrical signals in scrambler therapy are thought to stimulate C-fibers of the affected dermatomes. These nerve fibers then transmit the electrical signal to the brain (via the spinal cord) and lead to changes in pain perception in the central nervous system. These changes include decreased central nervous system hyper-responsiveness to the pain signal and a decrease in continuous pain signal input. The decrease in continuous pain input is thought to be due to the pain signal travelling from the affected area being "scrambled" or diluted by many other scrambler signals also travelling to the brain from the affected area. Scrambler therapy has also been shown to decrease certain pro-inflammatory, pro-nociceptive peptides such as nerve growth factor, and this effect is thought to lead to a sustained analgesic effect after the treatment session.

Unlike transcutaneous electrical nerve stimulation (TENS), another form of transcutaneous electrical stimulation for pain relief, in which the analgesic benefit has only been seen during and sometimes in the immediate hours after treatment, treatment with scrambler therapy has been shown to produce long lasting pain relief. Pain relief with scrambler therapy is often sustained for weeks, months or even years after the treatment sessions are completed.

== Contraindications ==
Scrambler therapy should not be used in those with implanted pacemakers, implantable defibrillators, spinal cord stimulators or peripheral nerve stimulators, nor in those with uncontrolled epilepsy.

== Side effects ==
Dermatologic adverse effects at the site of electrode placement are rare, including dermatitis and eccymosis. Systemic adverse effects have not been reported.

== Research ==
There is limited evidence that scrambler therapy may be effective for short-term relief of pain.

== History ==
The technique was invented by Giuseppe Marineo at the University of Rome Tor Vergata. Marineo co-authored and published a research paper on the topic in 2000. Scrambler therapy was FDA approved in 2009 for the treatment of chronic or neuropathic pain in professionally supervised treatment sessions in a medical setting.

== See also ==
- Bio-electric stimulation therapy
- Electrical muscle stimulation
