= Eric Staves =

American actor (born 1990)

- Born: November 30, 1990 (age 35); Liberty, Missouri, United States
- Education: Liberty High School
- Alma mater: DePaul University (BFA)
- Occupation: Actor
- Years active: 2009–present

Eric Staves (born November 30, 1990) is an American actor. Active since 2009, he is best known for his role as Ben Baity in the 2016 feature film Goat.

== Early life and education ==
Staves was born and raised in Liberty, Missouri. During his time at Liberty High School , he was highly active in extracurriculars, lettering in football for three years. He also competed on the school's forensics and debate team, eventually becoming a Missouri state champion. Outside of school, Staves was involved in the Boy Scouts of America and achieved the rank of Eagle Scout in 2008.

Following high school, Staves attended DePaul University in Chicago, where he earned a Bachelor of Fine Arts (BFA) degree.

== Career ==
Staves began his acting career in 2009 with a role in the short film Per Capita. He has since built a steady resume across both film and television. In addition to independent films like Onion Syrup (2012) and The View from Tall (2016), he gained wider recognition for his supporting role in the Nick Jonas-led fraternity drama Goat (2016).

On television, Staves has made guest appearances on several prominent network and cable series, including Chicago Med, Grey's Anatomy, Snowfall, and Ryan Murphy's American Horror Story: 1984.

== Filmography ==
=== Film ===
Year	Title	Role	Notes
2009	Per Capita	Server	Short film
2012	Onion Syrup	DJ Derrick Star	
2016	Goat	Ben Baity	
2016	The View from Tall	Brett	
2016	Monsters Anonymous	The Count	Short film
2018	Animator	Waiter	
2020	Ancient Ashes and Selfies	Ben	
2021	The Devil Comes to Kansas City	Levi Johnson	

=== Television ===
Year	Title	Role	Notes
2013–2015	The Platoon of Power Squadron	Danny	TV series
2014	The Dreamers	Zaith	Season 1, Episode 8
2017	Chicago Med	Ike	Episode: "Uncharted Territory"
2018	Grey's Anatomy	Luke	Episode: "Games People Play"
2018	Snowfall	LAPD Dillon	Episode: "Aftermath"
2019	American Horror Story: 1984	Dustin	Episode: "Episode 100"
2020	Dirty John	Drew	Season 2, Episode 3
2021	Station 19	Tad	Episode: "Make No Mistake, He's Mine"
2025	Platonic	Tom	Season 2, Episodes 1 & 4
