= Breaking a Monster =

Breaking A Monster
- Directed by: Luke Meyer
- Written by: Luke Meyer; Brad Turner
- Produced by: Tom Davis; Thad Luckinbill; Trent Luckinbill; Molly Smith
- Starring: Unlocking the Truth; Alec Atkins; Malcolm Brickhouse; Jarad Dawkins; Alan Sacks
- Cinematography: Ethan Palmer; Hillary Spera
- Edited by: Brad Turner
- Production companies: Black Label Media; SeeThink Films
- Distributed by: Abramorama
- Release dates: March 14, 2015 (SXSW); June 24, 2016
- Running time: 93 minutes
- Country: United States
- Language: English

Breaking a Monster is a 2015 American documentary film directed by Luke Meyer. The film follows the teen heavy metal band Unlocking the Truth through a monumental year in which they take on a manager (Alan Sacks, known for creating Welcome Back Kotter, producing Thrashin’ and for his work with The Jonas Brothers), sign a $1.8 million record deal with Sony Music, tour across North America, and record their first album. The film is made in an observational style, following the teen musicians, Alec Atkins, Malcom Brickhouse and Jarad Dawkins, through a series of life-changing events, touching on themes of child-stardom, racial representation and the stark realities of the music industry.

The feature documentary followed a short from two years earlier that Luke Meyer had made about the band when they were 11 year-olds. The feature documentary was produced by Black Label Media with SeeThink Films.

== Release ==
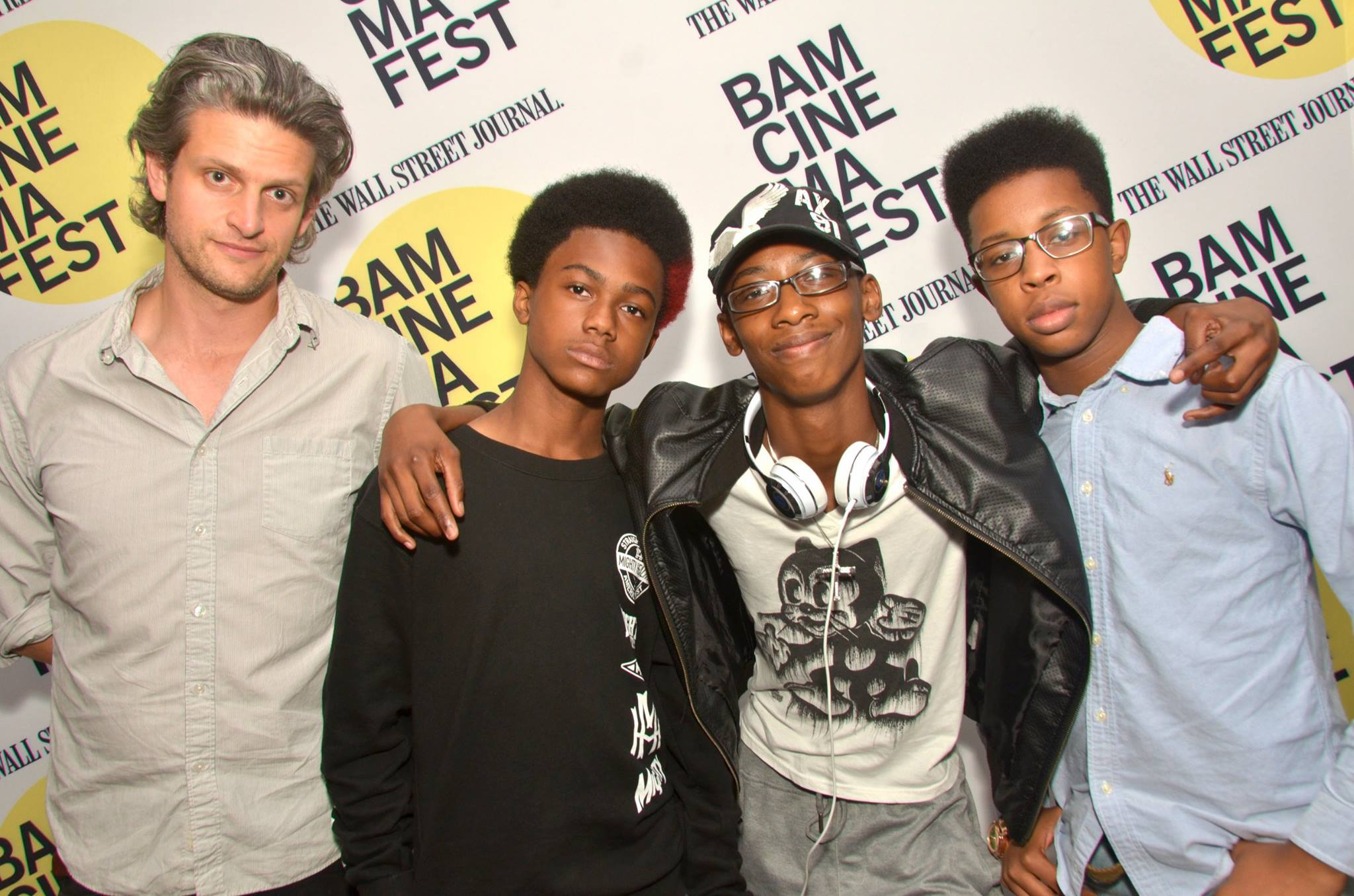
Director Luke Meyer and Unlocking the Truth members Malcolm Brickhouse, Alec Atkins and Jarad Dawkins at BAM CinemaFest in 2015

The film premiered at the South By SouthWest Film Festival on March 14, 2015. It played at film festivals in many different counties, including the HotDocs Film Festival, Sheffield DocFest, BAM CinemaFest, Zurich Film Festival, Indie Memphis, Camden International Film Festival, RIDM, Wind-Up Fest, CPH:DOX and others. It was nominated for the Youth Jury Prize at Sheffield DocFest, the Best International Documentary at the Zurich Film Festival and the Cinematic Non-Fiction Award at the Little Rock Film Festival. It won the Jury Prize at Sound Unseen, and Best Music Documentary at the UK Music Video Awards. The film was released theatrically by Abramorama, premiering on June 24, 2016 at the Museum of the Moving Image in Astoria, Queens where Unlocking the Truth also played a live concert.

== Critical Response ==
The film has a 100% rating on Rotten Tomatoes, and a “generally favorable” 72/100 rating on Metacritic.
