= Goat (2016 film) =

- Theatrical release poster
- Directed by: Andrew Neel
- Screenplay by: David Gordon Green; Andrew Neel; Mike Roberts
- Based on: Goat by Brad Land
- Produced by: James Franco; David Hinojosa; Vince Jolivette; Christine Vachon
- Starring: Nick Jonas; Ben Schnetzer; Gus Halper; Daniel Flaherty; Jake Picking; Virginia Gardner; Austin Lyon; Eric Staves; James Franco
- Cinematography: Ethan Palmer
- Edited by: Brad Turner
- Music by: Arjan Miranda
- Production companies: Great Point Media; Killer Films; Rabbit Bandini Productions
- Distributed by: The Film Arcade; Paramount Home Video
- Release dates: January 22, 2016 (Sundance); September 23, 2016 (United States)
- Running time: 96 minutes
- Country: United States
- Language: English
- Box office: $23,020

Goat is a 2016 American drama film directed by Andrew Neel and written by David Gordon Green, Neel, and Mike Roberts; it is based on the book Goat: A Memoir by Brad Land. It stars Ben Schnetzer, Nick Jonas, Gus Halper, Daniel Flaherty, Jake Picking, Virginia Gardner and James Franco. The film had its world premiere at the Sundance Film Festival on January 22, 2016. The film was released on September 23, 2016, by The Film Arcade and Paramount Home Video with a limited theatrical release and a same day video on demand distribution.

== Plot ==
Reeling from a terrifying assault over the summer, 19-year-old Brad Land starts college determined to get his life back to normal. His brother, Brett, is already established on campus and is a member of a fraternity that lures Brad in with its promise of protection, popularity, and life-long friendships. Brad is desperate to belong but as he sets out to join the fraternity his brother exhibits reservations, a sentiment that threatens to divide them. As the pledging ritual moves into hell week, a rite that promises to usher these unproven boys into manhood, the stakes violently increase with a series of torturous and humiliating events. The pledges are taken to an off-campus site in the woods, where they are told they either need to drink large quantities of beer, or if they fail they need to sodomize and then kill a goat. They pass the test, and are told the hazing is over. During the crossing ceremony, Brad becomes upset that his brother did not attend and confronts him. Their argument becomes heated and they almost fight each other. Brett says Brad does not belong in the fraternity after seeing how bad the hazing process was.

Events culminate when Will, Brad's pledge brother, dies of a heart attack while exercising on the track field and his body was shown to be covered in bruises from hazing. The pledges, particularly Brad, are warned not to reveal anything to the authorities. The university launches an investigation into Phi Sigma Mu and the fraternity is suspended from campus after someone had told the investigators all about the hazing process. The pledge master suspects Brad for leaking information to the university. Brad comes back to his dorm after class to find his goat defecating on the carpet with "Rat Fuck" shaved into its coat.

After confronting the brothers at the house, Brad gets accused of speaking to the authorities but Brett steps in and reveals himself as the source of the leaks.

Brett and Brad both go to the police station to identify Brad's attackers from 6 months ago. One of them is revealed to have been shot in a gas station robbery, while the other has yet to be identified in a line up. Brad lies and says none of the men are the one who assaulted him. The final scene is of Brad and Brett visiting the field where Brad was beaten.

== Cast ==
- Nick Jonas as Brett Land
- Ben Schnetzer as Brad Land
- Gus Halper as Chance
- Daniel Flaherty as Will
- Virginia Gardner as Leah
- James Franco as Mitch
- Austin Lyon as Dave
- Jake Picking as Dixon Rowley
- Brock Yurich as Wes
- Will Pullen as The Smile
- Eric Staves as Ben Baity
- Connor Harris as Mark Mullens
- Chase Crawford as Goat Boy
- Jamar Jackson as The Breath
- Chewie as The Goat

== Production ==
In October 2014, it was announced that James Franco would produce the film under his Rabbit Bandini Productions banner, while Andrew Neel would direct from a screenplay written by David Gordon Green, with revisions by Neel and Mike Roberts. Christine Vachon and David Hinojosa was reported to produce under their Killer Films banner while John Wells would serve as an executive producer. In January 2015, Nick Jonas and Ben Schnetzer joined the cast of the film. In May 2015, Virginia Gardner joined the cast of the film.

=== Filming ===
Filming began on May 4, 2015, in Finneytown, Ohio, a small suburb outside Cincinnati, Ohio.

== Release ==
The film had its world premiere at the Sundance Film Festival on January 22, 2016. Shortly after, Paramount Home Video and acquired worldwide distribution rights to the film, with Paramount partnering with a third-party in the U.S. for a theatrical release with Paramount handling same-day VOD with its sister network MTV having the first TV window. The partner later was revealed to be The Film Arcade. It was screened in the Panorama section of the 66th Berlin International Film Festival. The film was screened at the Seattle International Film Festival on May 27, 2016. The film was released on September 23, 2016.

=== Critical response ===
On review aggregator Rotten Tomatoes, the film holds an approval rating of 79% on review aggregator Rotten Tomatoes based on 77 reviews, with an average rating of 6.70/10. The site's critical consensus reads "Goat isn't an easy watch, but its thought-provoking themes, talented cast, and all-out intensity offer rewards for viewers willing to tough it out." On Metacritic the film has a score of 64 out of 100 score, based on 25 critics, indicating "generally favorable" reviews.
