= Darkon (film) =

- Promotional poster for Darkon
- Directed by: Luke Meyer; Andrew Neel
- Produced by: Tom Davis; Ethan Palmer; Christopher Kikis; Thoma Kikis; Nicholas Levis; Domenic Romano (associate producer); Cherise Wolas; Alan Zelenetz
- Starring: Skip Lipman; Daniel McCarthur; Rebecca Thurmond; Kenyon Wells; Andrew Mattingly
- Cinematography: Karl F. Schroder; Hillary Spera
- Edited by: Brad Turner
- Music by: Jonah Rapino
- Production companies: SeeThink Films; Ovie Entertainment
- Distributed by: IFC (TV); AOL (Streaming)
- Release date: March 2006 (SXSW)
- Running time: 89 Minutes
- Country: United States
- Language: English

Darkon is a 2006 American documentary film that follows the real-life adventures of the Darkon Wargaming Club in Baltimore, Maryland, a group of fantasy live-action role-playing (LARP) gamers. The film was directed by Andrew Neel and Luke Meyer, who engaged in a collaborative process with the role-players of the Darkon Wargaming Club as they made the documentary. Meyer and Neel began filming for the documentary in 2003.

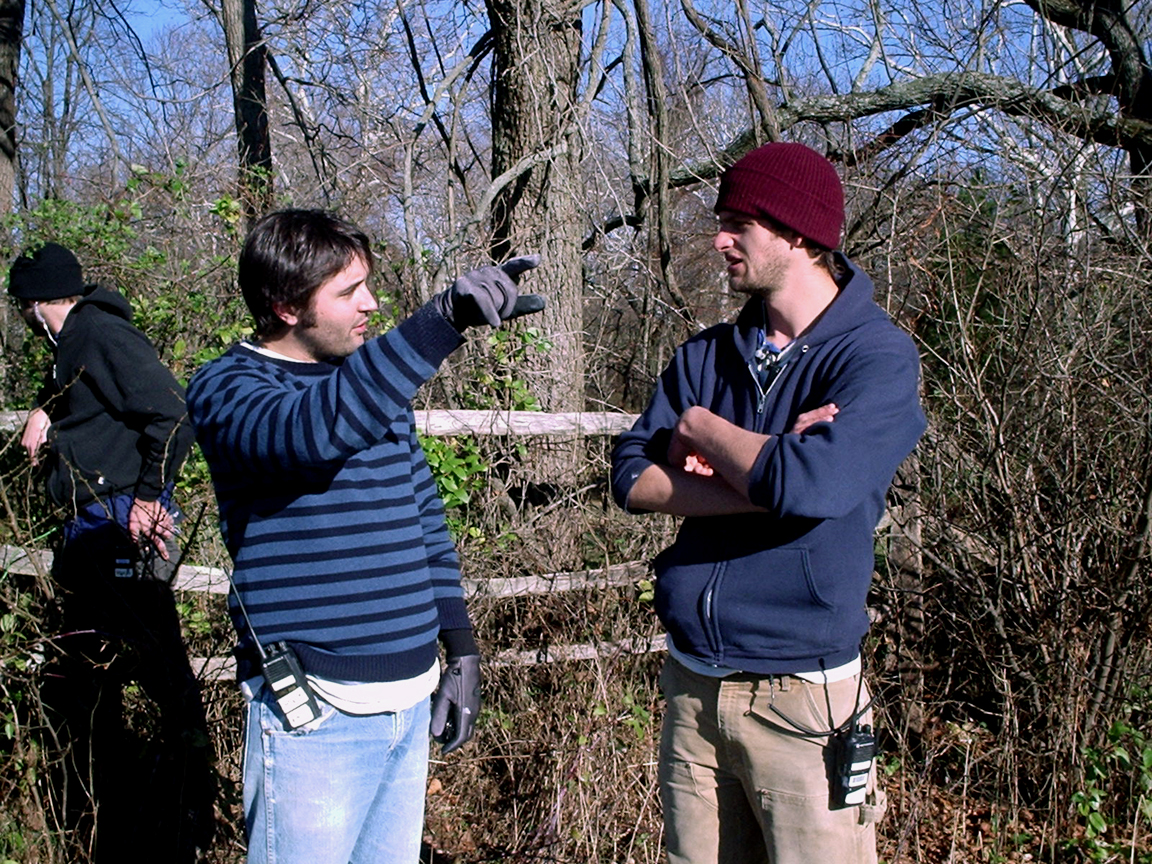
Directors Andrew Neel and Luke Meyer filming Darkon in 2004

Darkon premiered and won the Best Documentary Audience Award at the 2006 South by Southwest (SXSW) Film Festival in Austin, Texas. Darkon was an official selection playing at Hot Docs, Maryland Film Festival, Silverdocs, LA Film Festival, Britdoc, Melbourne International Film Festival and the Camden International Film Festival.

The film was produced by Ovie Entertainment and SeeThink Films.

The documentary served as inspiration for the 2008 comedy film Role Models. John Hodgman was also hired to write a scripted film adaptation of Darkon. However, plans fell through, but an excerpt of the unproduced screenplay was read on his podcast Judge John Hodgman.

== Reception ==
Darkon was well received by critics. The film was a New York Times Critic's Pick and has an 89% rating on Rotten Tomatoes, based on the reviews of 19 critics.
