= Ovie Entertainment =

Ovie Logo

Ovie Entertainment is an American independent film motion picture production company based in New York City.

Founded by Thoma Kikis, Christopher Kikis, Nicholas Levis, Cherise Wolas, and Alan Zelenetz in 2003 to produce independent and commercially viable films and with an obligation to the past century of World Cinema.

The Ovie name and logo was created in 1999 by Thoma Kikis after he removed the M from the word Movie. Among the films that are currently in production are a feature documentary Darkon and a dramatic thriller based on the novel Andorra by novelist Peter Cameron.

== Selected list of Ovie films ==
- Darkon (2006)
- The Funeral Party (2008)
- Andorra scheduled in (2009)
