= Andrew Neel =

American filmmaker

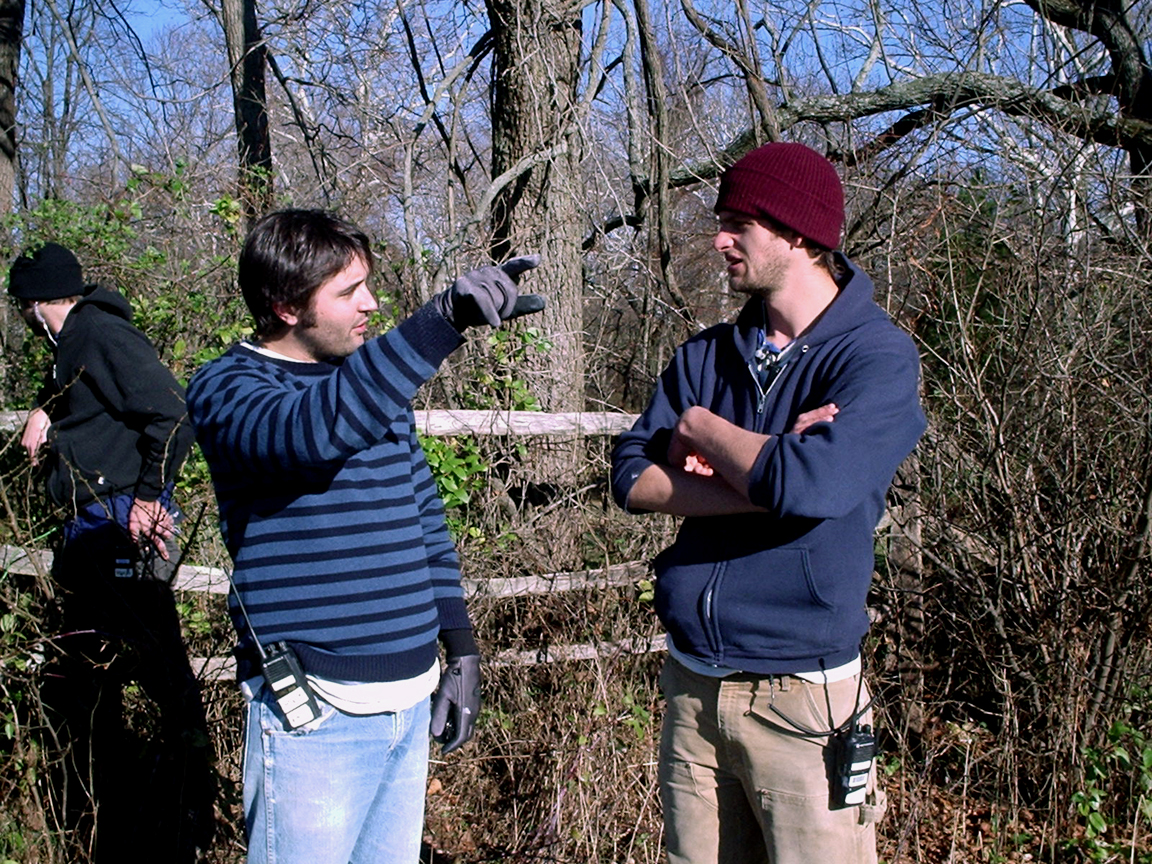
- Born: Vermont, United States
- Education: Northfield Mount Herman (high school) Columbia College (BA)
- Alma mater: Columbia College
- Occupation: Filmmaker
- Notable work: Darkon, New World Order, King Kelly
- Relatives: Elizabeth Neel (sister); Alice Neel (grandmother)

Andrew Neel is an American filmmaker, known as the creator of the films Darkon, New World Order and King Kelly.

== Early life ==
Andrew Neel was born in Vermont in 1978. He is the grandson of the visual artist Alice Neel and his sister is artist Elizabeth Neel.^{[1][2]} He attended boarding school at Northfield Mount Hermon High School in Massachusetts. He attended Columbia College and graduated with a BA in Film Studies in 2001.

== Career ==
Neel founded Seethink Productions in 2001 after graduating from Columbia College with a BA in Films Studies. In 2003 Seethink Productions became Seethink Films adding partners Ethan Palmer, Luke Meyer and Tom Davis

Neel has directed and produced award winning documentaries including Darkon, Alice Neel, and The Feature. Neel’s critically acclaimed fictional film Goat premiered at Sundance and Berlin in 2016 and was released by Paramount in 2016. He co-wrote Zola, produced by A24 and released in 2021. Previously he produced Fleischner’s 2013 film Stand Clear of the Closing Doors and the documentary Breaking a Monster in 2015. Neel also worked as a writer, director and co-producer on the FX limited series A Teacher, released 2020.

== Awards ==
Neel's first film, Darkon, won the Audience Award at the South by Southwest Film Festival and was acquired by IFCtv. The film was optioned for narrative fiction re-make by Paramount via Plan B Entertainment, which was to be written by John Hodgman. Neel's second film, Alice Neel, was acquired by Art House Films. It won the Audience Award at the Newport Beach Film Festival. His third film, The Feature, premiered at the Berlin International Film Festival in 2008 and won the New Visions Award at the Copenhagen International Documentary Festival. It screened at MOMA in 2009. Also that year, Neel co-directed New World Order (2009) which was produced by IFCtv. Stand Clear of the Closing Doors won the Special Jury Prize at the Tribeca Film Festival in 2013.

== Filmography as director ==
- Darkon (2006)
- Alice Neel (2007)
- The Feature (2008)
- New World Order (2009)
- King Kelly (2012)
- Goat (2016)
