= Chemotherapy-induced peripheral neuropathy =

- Other names: CIPN
- Specialty: Neurology

Chemotherapy-induced peripheral neuropathy (CIPN) is a nerve-damaging side effect of antineoplastic agents in the common cancer treatment, chemotherapy. CIPN afflicts between 30% and 40% of patients undergoing chemotherapy. Antineoplastic agents in chemotherapy are designed to eliminate rapidly dividing cancer cells, but they can also damage healthy structures, including the peripheral nervous system. CIPN involves various symptoms such as tingling, pain, and numbness in the hands and feet. These symptoms can impair activities of daily living, such as typing or dressing, reduce balance, and increase risk of falls and hospitalizations. They can also give cause to reduce or discontinue chemotherapy. Researchers have conducted clinical trials and studies to uncover the various symptoms, causes, pathogenesis, diagnoses, risk factors, and treatments of CIPN.

== Symptoms and signs ==
CIPN symptoms manifest themselves as deficits in sensory, motor, and/or autonomic functions of varying intensity, and they can significantly reduce a patient's functional quality of life. Sensory symptoms affecting the hands and feet generally develop first. Sensory side effects are caused when nerves in the most distal parts of the limbs are damaged. Patients may experience numbness, tingling, altered touch sensation, gait and balance disturbances, burning pain, thermal allodynia or hyperalgesia, impaired vibration sense, extreme temperature sensitivity, paresthesia, and/or dysesthesia as part of sensory damage. On the other hand, motor symptoms are less frequently seen as sensory symptoms. Motor symptoms of CIPN can include cramping, distal weakness, difficulty handling small objects, and impaired movements. In severe cases, motor symptoms can lead to complete immobilization and severe disability. Finally, autonomic symptoms usually involve orthostatic hypotension, constipation, and altered urinary function. A patient experiencing CIPN symptoms may have difficulty performing daily functionalities like walking, dressing themselves, writing, typing, and other activities related to the hands and feet.

The prevalence of these symptoms is highest in the first month after the completion of chemotherapy at 68.1%, but as many as 30% of patients still report CIPN symptoms six months after the completion of chemotherapy. Paclitaxel and oxaliplatin, representatives from two of the six major antineoplastic agents causing CIPN, cause acute neuropathy, which manifests during or immediately after treatment infusion. The other four groups of agents generally cause late symptoms that emerge weeks after the completion of chemotherapy. In both cases, the severity of the symptoms are generally proportional to the dose of the treatment drug received, and the severity of the symptoms may warrant a reduction in the chemotherapy dosage. Pain and sensory abnormalities can persist for months or years after treatment completion. Some patients may experience "coasting," where symptoms intensify after completion of treatment. As such, patients can be cancer-free and still suffer from disabling neuropathy induced by cancer treatment.

== Causes ==
There are six main agent groups found in chemotherapy treatment that damage the sensory, motor, and autonomic neurons and therefore cause CIPN: platinum-based compounds, taxanes, vinca alkaloids, epothilones, proteasome inhibitors and immunomodulatory drugs.

=== Platinum-based compounds ===
Platinum-based compounds, namely oxaliplatin, cisplatin, and carboplatin (which is noticeably less neurotoxic than cisplatin), are used to treat several types of solid tumors, such as stomach, liver, lung, ovarian, brain, and uterine cancers. These agents can damage dorsal root ganglia neurons by forming adducts with nuclear and mitochondrial DNA. This damage can cause neuronal apoptosis, programmed cell death, which leads to neuropathy. Additionally, functional neuronal deficits have been identified, independent of structural damage, e.g. ion channelopathy, impaired spike encoding in the central and peripheral nervous system. Specific side effects of platinum compounds include hearing loss, tinnitus, and dysesthesia. These symptoms generally begin with the or third cycle of treatment and can last long after treatment completion. Indeed, the "coasting" phenomenon mentioned in the Symptoms section is a direct effect of platinum agents. Of the platinum compounds, research has shown cisplatin to be the most frequently involved in peripheral neuropathy.

=== Taxanes ===
Taxanes, including paclitaxel (and protein-bound pactiltaxel e.g. abraxane), docetaxel, and cabazitaxel, are used to treat ovarian, breast, non-small cell lung, and prostate cancers. These drugs interfere with the normal cycling of microtubule depolymerization and repolymerization in small diameter sensory fibers to create sensory dominant neuropathy. Sensory side effects include paresthesias, dysesthesias, numbness, altered proprioception, and loss of dexterity in fingers and toes. Motor and autonomic symptoms are less frequent but possible. Symptoms may start days after the patient receives their first dose of chemotherapy, are dose dependent, and tend to improve after completion of treatment. However, in some cases, symptoms can persist six months or later following the completion of chemotherapy. Of the taxanes, paclitaxel has the most intense symptoms that may last for the longest time.

=== Vinca alkaloids ===
Vinca alkaloids, including vincristine, vinblastine, vinorelbine, and vindesine, are used to treat tumors such as Hodgkin lymphoma, testicular cancer, and non-small cell lung cancer. These drugs inhibit the assembly of microtubules and thus disrupt axonal transport in the cell body of peripheral nerves. Vinca alkaloids induce sensorimotor neuropathy, decreased sensation, in the hands and feet. Symptoms of vinca alkaloids include muscle weakness, initial pain after receiving an infusion, and cramping. These symptoms usually appear within the first three months of treatment. Of the vinca alkaloids, the most neurotoxic drug is vincristine. Vincristine disrupts the microtubular axonal transport system, which induces axonal neuropathy, distal numbness and tingling, and pain.

=== Epothilones ===
Epothilones, mainly ixabepilone, are relatively new drugs that can be used to treat non-small lung, ovarian, and prostate cancers. Epothilones cause microtubule disruption (like taxane-based drugs), which impairs axonal transport and leads to hyperexcitability of peripheral neurons. They can cause neuropathy characterized by paresthesias, numbness, and pain in the hands and feet. Sensory and motor symptoms are commonly seen in patients treated with epothilone, which generally results in muscle weakness, while autonomic symptoms are rarely seen. The symptoms of this drug occur during treatment and tend to stop after completion. As of 2019, epothilones are not approved by the Food and Drug Administration for patient usage and are generally used only for patients not responding to other available chemotherapies.

=== Proteasome inhibitors ===
Proteasome inhibitors, namely bortezomib, are used in the treatment of multiple myeloma and certain types of lymphoma. Bortezomib increases the production of sphingosine-1 phosphate, tumor necrosis factor α, and interleukin-1β, which ultimately leads to the development of neuropathic pain. The side effects of receiving bortezomib include chronic, distal, and symmetrical sensory peripheral neuropathy and neuropathic pain syndrome which may last for weeks, months, or years after treatment completion.

=== Immunomodulatory drugs ===
Immunomodulatory drugs, mainly thalidomide, are used to treat multiple myeloma. The anticancer mechanism of these drugs are not completely understood, but they are believed to accelerate neuronal cell death and block angiogenesis. Side effects of thalidomide-induced peripheral neuropathy include sensory symptoms, possible motor impairment, and gastrointestinal and cardiovascular autonomic manifestations. The symptoms of immunomodulatory drugs may dictate whether treatment is continued or discontinued, and they can last long-term after chemotherapy completion.

== Risk factors ==
There are various factors that appear to predict the development of CIPN symptoms. Genetically, there are currently multiple single nucleotide polymorphisms potentially associated with CIPN, as identified through the Genome Wide Association Studies. The reported polymorphisms are associated with a range of protein including voltage-gated sodium channels, Schwann cell function-related proteins, receptors for cell surface collagen, receptors involved in neuronal apoptosis, neuronal crest cell development, and an enzyme involved in pyruvate metabolism.

Additionally, there are various diagnoses that may increase a patient's risk of developing CIPN: 1) A history with acquired or hereditary neuropathy from diabetes, renal disease, hypothyroidism, connective tissue disease, or vitamin deficiencies is a risk factor. 2) A diagnosis of current or previous infectious disease such as Human Immunodeficiency Virus, Poliomyelitis, and Hepatitis B or C may increase a patient's risk. 3) Exposure to medications linked to neurotoxicity, such as cyclosporine, vancomycin, and cimetidine, in the treatment of a previous diagnosis.

There are also personal and treatment characteristics that may be potential risk factors: 1) Older age 2) Chemotherapy type 3) Cumulative dosage of chemotherapy treatment 4) Smoking history 5) History of alcohol intake 6) Dietary history 7) Race 8) Gender 9) Inactive lifestyle. In particular, the cumulative dosage of chemotherapeutic agents is a well-recognized risk factor of CIPN.

== Diagnosis ==
Evaluation of a patient's medical history for the risk factors listed above is essential in the assessment of CIPN because CIPN symptoms may overlap with other comorbid conditions. Furthermore, the heterogeneity of CIPN means that patients describe their neuropathic symptoms in different ways. Some may report the impact of neuropathy in their daily life (e.g. difficulty with buttons, dropping objects, difficulty walking, etc.), and others might report traditional distal extremity numbness, burning, or pain. To assess the impact of symptoms on a patient's quality of life, clinicians currently use the Quality of Life Questionnaire-CIPN twenty item scale (CIPN-20) developed by the European Organisation for Research and Treatment of Cancer. The CIPN-20 asks patients to rate their experience with different symptoms during a given period of time using scores from 1 ("not at all") to 4 ("very much"). The results provide clinicians with critical information on a patient's functional limitations in relation to their exposure to potentially neurotoxic chemotherapeutic agents. In addition to the CIPN-20, the clinical Total Neuropathy Score for CIPN (TNS-c) can also be used to assess neuropathy signs and symptoms. The TNS-c has shown to be highly accurate in scoring the severity of CIPN, especially how it changes.

Physical examination to assess motor function, reflexes, gait and balance, and sensation also plays a key role in the diagnosis of CIPN. First, motor testing involves assessment of muscle tone and bulk, which may be decreased in patients with CIPN due to atrophy and hypotonia. Commonly affected muscle groups to look out for include the distal muscles of the hands, feet, and ankles. Second, a patient's reflexive response is tested. The reflexes of patients with CIPN are frequently diminished, if not gone entirely. Dysfunction of the Achilles reflex is especially common. Third, gait testing includes testing a patient's ability to walk on their heels and toes. Patients with distal foot weakness, a symptom of CIPN, may be unable to walk on their heels and commonly drag their toes while walking. The Romberg sign is also frequently tested to indicate a patient's sense of balance. If patients are unable to stand with their feet together and their eyes closed, proprioceptive loss, commonly seen with CIPN, can be assumed.

Finally, sensory testing includes the assessment of pain, vibration, and position sense. With their eyes closed, patients will be subjected to various stimuli to test their sensation. Pain can be tested with sharp stimulus such as a pin or a toothpick. Patients with CIPN may report objective numbness, dysesthesia, or increased pain with this pinprick test. Vibratory sensation can be tested using a tuning fork applied to distal interphalangeal joints in the fingers and toes. Patients with CIPN commonly report vibratory sensation lasting less than eight seconds of absent vibration. Position sense can be tested by having a patient close his or her eyes with an examiner moving a distal joint up or down. Patients with CIPN will often be unable to correctly determine the direction of movement.

In addition to examination of neurological symptoms, analysis of the administered drugs, the cumulative dosage, and the clinical characteristics and duration of the neuropathic symptoms are also important in the diagnosis of CIPN. First, clinicians consider if the patient received a neurotoxic chemotherapeutic known to induce CIPN, such as the drugs from the six main groups (i.e. platinum-based compounds, taxanes, vinca alkaloids, epothilones, proteasome inhibitors, and immunomodulatory drugs). The route of drug administration is also considered because there are some drugs that may not be associated with neurotoxicity, unless administered through a certain route. For example, methotrexate is rarely correlated with neurotoxicity except when administered intrathecally, and bortezomib neurotoxicity can decrease with subcutaneous administration. Second, the drug dose the patient received, and if its amount is commensurate with developing CIPN, may be considered. The immunomodulatory drug bortezomib, for example, is more likely to cause neurotoxicity in a cumulative dose of 20 grams. Finally, the characteristics and the duration of a patient's symptoms are analyzed. The onset of symptoms during or close after chemotherapy is generally described as affecting sensation in the feet first, then in the hands and fingers. If a patient experiences such abnormalities in sensation, then CIPN may be suspected. Furthermore, most CIPN symptoms appear during the first two months of treatment, progress during treatment, and stabilize after completion. It would be unexpected for CIPN to first appear weeks or months after the last dose of chemotherapy treatment.

In CIPN, sudomotor function, through electrochemical skin conductance allows for an objective quantification of small fiber impairment and is easy to implement in the clinic.

== Treatment and prevention ==
=== Pharmacological ===
==== Prevention ====
A 2020 American Society of Clinical Oncology (ASCO) report provided an updated list of drugs tested and not recommended for prevention of CIPN. These recommendations are evidence-based, informed by randomized trials (RCTs) and guided by expert clinical experience.

- Acetyl-L-carnitine
- All-trans retinoic acid
- Amifostine
- Amitriptyline
- Calcium magnesium
- Cannabinoids
- Diethyldithiocarbamate
- Glutamate/Glutamine
- Glutathione
- Metformin
- Minocycline
- N-acetylcysteine
- Nimodipine
- Omega-3 fatty acids
- Org 2766
- Oxcarbazepine
- Retinoic acid
- Venlafaxine
- Vitamin B
- Vitamin E

==== Treatment ====
A 2020 ASCO report provided an updated list of drugs tested and not recommended for treatment of CIPN. These recommendations are evidence-based, informed by RCTs and guided by expert clinical experience.

- Gabapentin/pregabalin
- Tricyclic antidepressants
- Baclofen
- Ketamine
- Amitriptyline
- Oral cannabinoids

As of 2020, duloxetine is the only drug that is currently recommended to treat established CIPN. There are data from various clinical trials demonstrating that duloxetine decreases CIPN pain and other CIPN symptoms. However, it does not eliminate CIPN symptoms, and it can also have unwanted side effects such as dizziness, dry mouth, constipation, and diarrhea. It is not approved by the Food and Drug Association for treatment of CIPN.

=== Behavioral ===
There are promising and safe behavioral interventions for CIPN that have been suggested to be helpful based on randomized clinical trials: 1) stretching 2) walking 3) resistance (strength) training 4) balance exercises 5) yoga 6) meditation.

Stretching, including nerve-gliding, is frequently included in a CIPN treatment plan to improve nerve excursion across joints, promote axoplasmic flow, and decrease inflammation. Examples of stretching exercises for the neck and upper limbs include shoulder rolls, overhead arm reaches, and arm extensions. Examples of stretches for the lower body include lunges and hamstring pulls. Stretches like these have been clinically shown to help alleviate pain and restore at least some mobility in patients with CIPN.

Walking can be effective in alleviating CIPN symptoms by boosting muscle power, increasing blood circulation, and improving balance. Walking provides low to moderately intense aerobic exercise (60–85% of heart rate reserve), and a regular walking schedule can decrease intensity and frequency of neuropathic symptoms while promoting healthy nerve growth and function. Resistance (strength) training has been tested in various clinical settings, and it has been shown to be helpful in treating CIPN symptoms such as temperature sensitivity, numbness, and tingling. By building muscle, strength training can improve a patient's ability to perform daily activities, improve balance, and reduce the risk of falling. Examples of strength training exercises include squats, overhead press, and calf raises.

Balance exercises, such as tightrope exercises and hip flexion, are shown to be effective in reducing pain and improving quality of life for patients with CIPN. They are important in enhancing a patient's proprioception, coordination, and preventing falls.

Somatic yoga is often used by cancer survivors for symptom management, and it has been found to improve physical and mental health for patients with CIPN. Yoga combines movement, breathing exercises, and meditation to foster connection between the mind and body. Practice may decrease pain-associated stress and help a patient relax through modulation of the neuroendocrine system through the hypothalamic-pituitary-adrenal axis. Yoga's emphasis on dynamic movement can lead to improvement in flexibility, strength, balance, and stability, all of which may be negatively impacted by CIPN.

Meditation helps to alleviate CIPN symptoms and CIPN-related stress by helping a patient relax and improve attention skills. By improving self-control and attention span, mediation helps to create emotional stability and enhances psycho-emotional balance.

Despite the potential of these interventions, none of them have been shown to definitively help with CIPN as of the 2020 ASCO report. and therefore more research is needed.

=== Other therapeutics ===
Cryotherapy for patients with CIPN involves wearing frozen gloves and socks or ice packs to prevent and relieve symptoms. Various studies have been conducted to trial cryotherapy or cryocompression therapy, and their results are largely inconclusive. One study demonstrated that the development of CIPN symptoms were significantly delayed after the usage of cryotherapy. Another concluded that there was no significant difference between control groups receiving chemotherapy and treatment groups receiving cryotherapy in addition to chemotherapy. The second study's results did, however, support that frozen gloves improved some measures of patient-reported quality-of-life. Similarly, compression therapy for patients with CIPN involves placing limbs in tight gloves or shoes. Studies testing compression therapy reported that sensory neuropathy was reduced in patients using tight surgical gloves. These studies are not conclusive, and additional randomized trials investigating the efficacy of cryotherapy and compression therapy for prevention and treatment of CIPN are ongoing. No conclusive recommendations about either therapy can be made as of 2020, although the potential harms of both are believed to be low to moderate.

Scrambler therapy is an electro-analgesia therapy that is designed to block the conduction of nerve fibers to produce an analgesic effect through transcutaneous electrical nerve stimulation (TENS). In other words, this therapy should interfere with ("scramble") the pain signal transmission of neurons by replacing it with "non-pain" information. One randomized trial evaluating the success of scrambler therapy in alleviating CIPN symptoms found no significant differences between treatment and control groups. Another trial testing scrambler therapy with patients with CIPN found patient-reported neuropathy symptoms and quality-of-life to be improved from baseline status. As of 2020, no conclusive recommendations can be made for scrambler therapy, but its potential harm is believed to be low.

== Current research ==
Various institutions, universities, and organizations have dedicated years to performing clinical trials and conducting research on CIPN. The scientific community has had multiple breakthroughs in the mechanisms, prevention, and treatment of CIPN. In 2017, the National Cancer Institute's Symptom Management and Health-Related Quality of Life Steering Committee convened a meeting of CIPN and oncology management experts in the Clinical Trials Planning Meeting to evaluate the state of current research and plan ahead for future investigation. The goals of the meeting included identification of optimal outcome measures to define the CIPN phenotype, establishment of parameters that guide the evaluation of clinically meaningful effects, the adoption of approaches for inclusion of translational and biomarker and/or genetic measures, and discussion of the next steps to implement ideas into future clinical trials. Some of the lessons and limitations they learned from conducting past CIPN research are that 1) there was insufficient collaboration between pre-clinical and clinical researchers 2) patient reported CIPN symptoms are more sensitive than clinician-based assessments 3) there is substantial heterogeneity in the forms of neuropathy manifested across different patients 4) there are promising and understudied behavioral interventions for CIPN that may appeal more to patients who do not want pharmacological treatments. Based on these lessons, the experts concluded that a multifaceted approach is needed to alleviate the burden of CIPN including more well-planned phase II intervention clinical trials, more longitudinal studies on the risk factors of CIPN, and the development of research networks to connect work from different research facilities. Overall, more research is needed to advance understanding of CIPN etiology, risk assessment, development, and treatment (e.g. duloxetine, genetic targets, and exercise). There are some drugs which are being evaluated in clinical trials. For example, tetrodotoxin (TTX) is very promising and showed efficacy for treating chemotherapy-induced peripheral neuropathy in clinical trials.
