= History of live action role-playing games =

Aspect of cultural history

Live action role-playing games, known as LARPs, are a form of role-playing game in which live players/actors assume roles as specific characters and play out a scenario in-character. Technically, many childhood games may be thought of as simple LARPs, as they often involve the assumption of character roles. However, the scope of this article concerns itself mainly with LARPing in a technical sense: the organized live-action role-playing games whose origins are closely related to the invention of tabletop role-playing games in America in the 1970s.

Live-action role playing appears to have been "invented" several times by different groups relying on local ideas and expertise. Sometimes such groups were inspired by reports of LARPs elsewhere. Such a multifarious process has led to an extremely diverse range of LARP practices and histories. By the 1980s, LARPs had spread to many countries and organizations, and different styles of play had been developed. During the 1990s, Mind's Eye Theatre was the first published LARP system to achieve popular status. Also during the 1990s, the hobby began to attract critical and academic analysis. For example, the 2003 Knutepunkt conference published a book entitled, As LARP Grows Up (subtitled Theory and Methods in LARP), to propose future directions for LARPs.

== Early history ==
It is likely that childhood LARP games date back to pre-history, with well-known games such as "cowboys and Indians," "house," and "doctor" stemming from earlier historical and pre-historical equivalents throughout many other cultures ("Athenians and Spartans", "hunting deer", etc.). Childhood LARPs tend to consist of very simple or no rules and reflect the surrounding culture.

Live-action role playing as practiced by adults has also existed for millennia in the form of historical reenactment. The ancient Romans recreated mythical scenes and naval battles in the Colosseum regularly. Likewise, the Han Chinese and medieval Europeans occasionally enjoyed organizing events in which participants pretended to be from an earlier age. Entertainment appears to have been the primary purpose of these activities. However, it appears that historical re-enactment only became a hobby in the 20th century.

Likewise, adults have used live-action role playing as an educational or practice exercise for centuries, with mock combats being an important part of military training, and mock treatments and trials used to teach doctors and lawyers. It's unclear to what extent these have been considered "games." The Prussian term for live-action military training exercises is kriegspiel or "Wargames," a term that has entered English as well, although the contemporary military prefers to call them military exercises to distinguish them from games.

Another early stream of LARP tradition is the improvisational theatre tradition. This goes back in some sense to the Commedia dell'arte tradition of 16th century. Modern improvisational theatre began in the classroom with the "theatre games" of Viola Spolin and Keith Johnstone in the 1950s. Viola Spolin, who was one of the founders of the famous comedy troupe The Second City, insisted that her exercises were games, and that they involved role-playing as early as 1946, but thought of them as training actors and comics rather than as being primarily aimed at being fun in their own right.

G. K. Chesterton's 1905 book The Club of Queer Trades includes a story describing a commercial organization which stages LARP-like adventures for the entertainment of its customers. It's possible that this may have helped to suggest later ideas for commercial LARPs.

In the 1920s, Model League of Nations clubs formed around the United States, creating a style of live-action role playing that was not thought of as a game per se but was thought of as a recreational pastime. There is some evidence that Assassin-style LARP games may have been played in New York City by adults in the early 20th century as well. The 1920s also saw the beginning of role playing used for psychotherapeutic purposes, often called psychodrama. It was championed in the US by Jacob L. Moreno. It was not thought of as a game, but the psychodrama tradition probably influenced LARP games as they later developed.

The 1960s saw the creation of fantasy LARPs (as distinct from pure historical re-enactments), which probably originate with the founding of the Society for Creative Anachronism in Berkeley, California, on May 1, 1966. A similar group, the Markland Medieval Mercenary Militia, began holding events on the University of Maryland, College Park, in 1969. These groups were largely dedicated to accurately recreating medieval history and culture with only mild fantasy elements, and were probably influenced by historical re-enactment.

In the 1970s, after the publication of the early tabletop role-playing game (Dungeons & Dragons) in 1974, Fantasy LARPs began springing up in many places somewhat independently.

== American history ==
American LARPs have no single point of origin, although many of the groups still in operation can claim a lengthy history.

Among the live-combat groups, Dagorhir Outdoor Improvisational Battle Games (Dagorhir) was founded by Bryan Weise in the Washington, D.C. area in 1977. The International Fantasy Gaming Society (IFGS), also live-combat but with a complex rules system more clearly influenced by Dungeons and Dragons, was started in 1981 in Boulder, Colorado. (IFGS took its name from a fictional group in the novel Dream Park by Larry Niven and Steven Barnes, which described highly realistic, futuristic LARPs.) At about the same time (but before 1981), the Assassins' Guild was created at the Massachusetts Institute of Technology (MIT) in Cambridge, Massachusetts, to pursue "killer" or "assassin"-style live-combat games with toy guns, but also to encourage creative design in LARPs. Assassination style LARPs spread to many other college campuses, even spawned two movies TAG: The Assassination Game in 1982, and Gotcha in 1985. Amtgard (a spin off of Dagorhir) was founded in 1983 in El Paso, Texas, and has hundreds of active groups in the US and Canada, while NERO International has over 50 chapters in the US and Canada. It was founded in 1988. In 1994, L’aventure du Duché de Bicolline was founded in Quebec, Canada.

Theatre Style LARP began in America at around the same time. In 1981, the Society for Interactive Literature (SIL) was founded by Walter Freitag, Mike Massimilla and Rick Dutton at Harvard University. The club's first public event was in February 1983, at the Boskone science fiction convention. A substantial part of the SIL membership broke off from that organization in 1991 and formed the Interactive Literature Foundation (ILF), which in 2000 changed its name to the Live Action Role-Players Association LARPA. The mid-Atlantic and northeastern US has been a center for Theatre Style events, especially the Intercon LARP conventions.

The northeastern LARP scene, founding place of the Realms of Wonder, SIL, NERO, Empires in Flames, and the MIT Assassin's Guild, continues to have an active LARP scene, due to the large number of college campuses present. Other universities along the East Coast have been strong "incubation" sites for northeastern LARPs. Early (pre-internet) campus-based LARPs formed in isolation, developing their own style of games with little crossover with other styles or regions. The existence of larger regional organizations, of published LARPs, and of the internet has helped to create a field of "LARP theory" and deliberate experimentation with LARP forms.

The region also plays host to many, smaller, fantasy-based LARPs, such as Lione Rampant, Quest Interactive Productions, Legends Roleplaying, Mythical Journeys and Chimera Entertainment's nTeraction (now Accelerant), all formed in the 1980s and 1990s by fantasy enthusiasts with a love for character roleplay and adventure, but without large player bases or complex rule systems. Quest is the oldest of these groups, dating back to 1986. Some of the other LARPs were formed as splinter groups of larger, more franchised LARPs, such as NERO. Such LARP groups tend to run in the spring and autumn, utilizing summer camp facilities (such as 4H and group campgrounds) in their off-seasons.

The Southeast is also home to a very large LARP community. The various Fantasy-based games are also splinters off NERO as well as one another, forming a relatively extensive list: SOLAR (the Southern Organization for Live Action Reenactments), Red Button Productions, and the experimental fantasy LARP Forest of Doors, among others. Many of these LARPs are run out of State Parks like in other areas, most often Hard Labor Creek State Park in Rutledge, Georgia, A.H. Stephens State Park, or Indian Springs State Park. Several World of Darkness-based games are also run out of Atlanta, as well as a Science Fiction Stargate-genre LARP, Stargate Atlanta FTX. The neighboring state of Tennessee has chapters of Heroic Interactive Theatre, including a Steampunk game, World of Hashonen. Amtgard and NERO also run games in Georgia, Florida and Tennessee.

Since 1999, the mid-Atlantic US has been a center for a number of crossover Theatre Style/Adventure Style events or "campaigns," which fall outside the medieval fantasy genre which tends to characterize a majority of Live Combat LARPs. An initial impetus for this was the attempt of various fantasy groups to adapt the Call of Cthulhu as a LARP genre, however the genre has expanded to substantially wider horizons. The progenitor LARP in this genre was Mike Young's Dark Summonings Campaign, followed by transitional LARPs including the Mersienne Medieval Fantasy Campaign (medieval fantasy), Outpost Chi (science fiction), 1948: Signals, 1936: Horror, as well as the heavily Call of Cthulhu based Altered Realities Campaign and the Victorian "steampunk" Brassy's Men Campaign. Together this network of current and previous events make up a substantial and innovative body of work which characterizes a vibrant mid-Atlantic US LARP Community. The rise of many campaigns all drawing from the same community has tended to preempt growth of non-campaign games, though, and to some degree push out the 'less dedicated' gamers due to the higher commitment needed.

== UK history ==
=== Treasure Trap and successors ===
Treasure Trap, formed in 1982 at Peckforton Castle in Cheshire, is recognised as the first LARP game in the UK. It featured rubber-weapon combat, heroic adventures and fantasy monsters. Over its three-year history, it garnered moderate attention from the press (even being featured on Blue Peter) and established a large, enthusiastic player-base. When it closed, numerous systems sprang up around the country to replace it.

Many of these systems copied most of the format, rules and setting of the original Treasure Trap. However, they were mostly independent of each other; despite their shared heritage, there was no shared world. Fools and Heroes was an exception: many branches of the same game were opened in different areas of the country.

These systems varied in their size and complexity. Some were established by university societies, and organised around the modest budgets of students. Others tried to expand the scope and size of the games - for example, Heroquest (founded in 1986) continues to run adventures lasting from 5 to 11 days and runs several events per month across the UK.

=== Weapon design ===
LARP weapon design advanced considerably after the innovation in 1986 of latex-coated weapons by Second skin (larp). This allowed a much greater level of detail and artistry in weapon design than the prior gaffer tape models. Over the next decade, home-made gaffer weapons were largely supplanted by professionally made latex ones. Some larps, such as Orions Sphere, use nerf guns as well as traditional weapons.

=== Festival LARP and Conventions ===
In the early 1990s, Summerfest, originally a meeting of the various Fools and Heroes branches, had gained an attendance of over a thousand players. This led to a style of LARP known as 'fest' LRP: unlike small games (often less than 50 players) fests often centre around warring factions and huge battles.

The Lorien Trust, formed in 1992, epitomised this principle with its flagship annual event The Gathering, which features battles with over a thousand players on each side, as well as complex politics, an SFX-driven magic ritual circle, a licensed tavern, and a large marketplace for the out-of-character sale of costumes, prosthetics, weapons, props and accessories. It quickly grew to become the largest festival LARP game in the UK, and has continued to be a significant influence in UK LARP design.

While the majority of LARP games were either 'medieval fantasy' or Vampire, a growing number of new games were experimenting with other genres, from science fiction to wild west to Celts to pirates. Some, such as Shards, deliberately crossed genres and worlds. Others, including Lorien Trust, would allow players to introduce virtually any concept to the game in a style known as 'Open World'.

The early 1990s also saw the introduction of White Wolf Publishing's Mind's Eye Theatre LARP, which introduced a largely new set of players to live roleplaying. Unlike most UK LARPs, it was based on indoor social interaction with minimal costuming requirements, and a combat/magic/interaction system based on rock-paper-scissors. There was some antipathy between Vampire and Fantasy LARPers, although some groups discarded the MET rules and used conventional LARP ideas (such as rubber weapons) instead.

Roleplaying conventions such as Gen Con UK, Dragonmeet and Continuum also became a venue for LARP games, usually 'Freeforms' with little emphasis on either combat or character development, but more on plot development, and player interaction.

The evident size of the UK LARP player-base suggested that there might be a market for LARP-related periodicals, and so professionally produced magazines such as The Scribe and The Adventurer were printed, including reviews, advice, photos and humour. These helped to expose players to the wide variety of games out there. However, none of these magazines got sufficient sales to survive, and the UK LRP community instead turned to emerging internet communities. Initially, these groups concentrated on specific local games until Starburst journalist Ed Fortune formed Pagga.com in 2000 as an attempt to form a wider online LRP community. The website closed in 2006 but spawned various online forums and a regular UK LARP convention, LarpCon UK.

=== Successors to the Lorien Trust ===
The Lorien Trust had a number of internal conflicts, and some of these led to new systems. In 1995, a large group broke away from LT to create Curious Pastimes, initially a spin-off of the LT's Erdreja campaign. Its principal event, Renewal, runs on the same weekend as The Gathering and is similarly themed, although the battles are mostly PvM rather than PvP. Renewal typically has around 700 players.

A later breakaway in from the LT in 1998 was the Omega LRP team. Their Phoenix campaign, however, was completely different from the LT, being 'Closed World', with an emphasis on community-building and trade, and a professed intention of 'Player-led plot', bucking the current trend of powerful NPCs controlling everything. The campaign ran for 5 years, until a group of PCs effectively destroyed the world. It had about 400 players.

Some of the Omega staff and players went on to create the Maelstrom campaign for Profound Decisions Ltd in 2004. This colonialism fantasy game sought to set new standards in player empowerment, and explicitly limited the power of NPCs and plotwriters. It supported a high degree of political, economic, sociological, technological and magical complexity. Maelstrom had around 800 players.

Later games designed by Profound Decisions include Odyssey, a tightly plotted and highly immersive fest larp set in a mythological version of the ancient world, which sought to combine traditional linear LARP "encounters" alongside the main festival roleplaying.

Profound Decisions continued UK LARP development and community growth with Empire LRP which as of 2019 has over 2,000 players at each of its four annual events.

As the LARP community has grown and the costs involved with running events have fallen, new LARP games are continually in development. Variations on combat including guns using Airsoft and NERF weaponry have appeared in a number of games, and there has been a wide expansion in the types of game being run, with games touching on sci-fi, survival horror, and steampunk amongst other genres.

== Russian history ==
LARP has been played in Russia since at least the 1980s. The Russian word for LARP translates simply as "role-playing", since tabletop RPGs were unknown in Russia at the time LARP was invented or introduced there. Russian live role-playing is often practised under the banner of "Tolkienism" or Tolkien fandom, though it is definitely no longer confined to Tolkien or fantasy only. Regional traditions vary greatly in their history and practice, though the now defunct Soviet "Young Pioneers" organisation and the networks between former members seems to have played some role in spreading and coordinating the idea of live role-playing. Much more involvement is usually attributed to SF fandom clubs, which flourished in Russia in that period.

Earliest documented mentions of LARP-like activities in Russia relate to the yearly memorial reenactment of the Battle of Borodino, where military history clubs, not satisfied with reenacting this battle only, tried various other takes on the subject—the first recorded one, in 1988, being the people dressing up as soldiers of Red Army. According to witness reports, in 1989 Tolkien fans came to the Borodino reenactment in fantasy costumes, which jumpstarted the movement and led to the first recorded large-scale LARP in Russia, the National Hobbit Games, which ran in August 1990 near river Mana in the vicinity of Krasnoyarsk. Since then, such events occur yearly and the tradition became very widely developed.

Russia probably has the biggest and most varied LARP-scene in the world, with a wide range of genres and playstyles. By now, the number of players is estimated to be somewhere between 50000 and 100000. The biggest plays number more than 1000 players. The largest project ever - "the Witcher: Something More" (2005) gathered more than 3200 participants, but many smaller plays (50-200 participants) are also common.

== Nordic history ==
In the early 1980s, the Swedish LARP group Gyllene Hjorten started a LARP campaign that is still ongoing. This is probably the first LARP event in the Nordic countries. LARP in Finland started in 1985 and Norway was initiated in 1989, more or less simultaneously by groups in Oslo and Trondheim. The first Danish games were also played in the late 1980s.

The Nordic LARP traditions, though usually invented independently of each other, have developed striking similarities and are also notably different from English language and German language LARPs. These differences are most obvious in the Nordic LARPs' skepticism towards game mechanics, a tendency to limit combat and magic - seeing these as "spice" rather than a necessary ingredient in LARP - and an emphasis on immersive environments where anachronisms and out of play elements (off-elements, such as visible cars or paved roads in a historical or fantasy setting) are avoided. The setting and roles may be given to the participants by the organizers, or suggested by the player to organizers, in either case usually based on a dialogue between the player and organizer. "character sheets", in the manner of tabletop RPGs, are for the most part not used.

When the game starts it lives its own life, wholly directed by the players (some predetermined events are often scheduled). A typical Swedish or Norwegian game lasts 2–5 days and has anywhere from fifty to hundreds of participants. A typical Danish or Finnish game lasts between four hours and a few days. Rules are designed for combat injury simulation and normally emphasize roleplaying of damage rather than abstract hitpoints (though this was not always so), featuring either padded weapons or blunt steel weapons. Each gaming organization uses custom rules, but simplicity and similarities make this less cumbersome than it would at first seem.

The annual Knutepunkt conference, first held in 1997, has been a vital institution in establishing a Nordic live role-playing identity, and in establishing the concept of "Nordic LARP" as a unique approach. A live-roleplaying avant-garde movement, which pursues radical experimentation and the recognition of role-playing as a form of art, has been connected to the Knutepunkt conferences. The scope of the Knutepunkt conference has expanded rather rapidly over the last few years with participants showing up from numerous non-Scandinavian countries. The last 2 or 3 years has seen participants from USA, Germany, France, Italy and Russia as well as from the main Nordic countries.

== German history ==
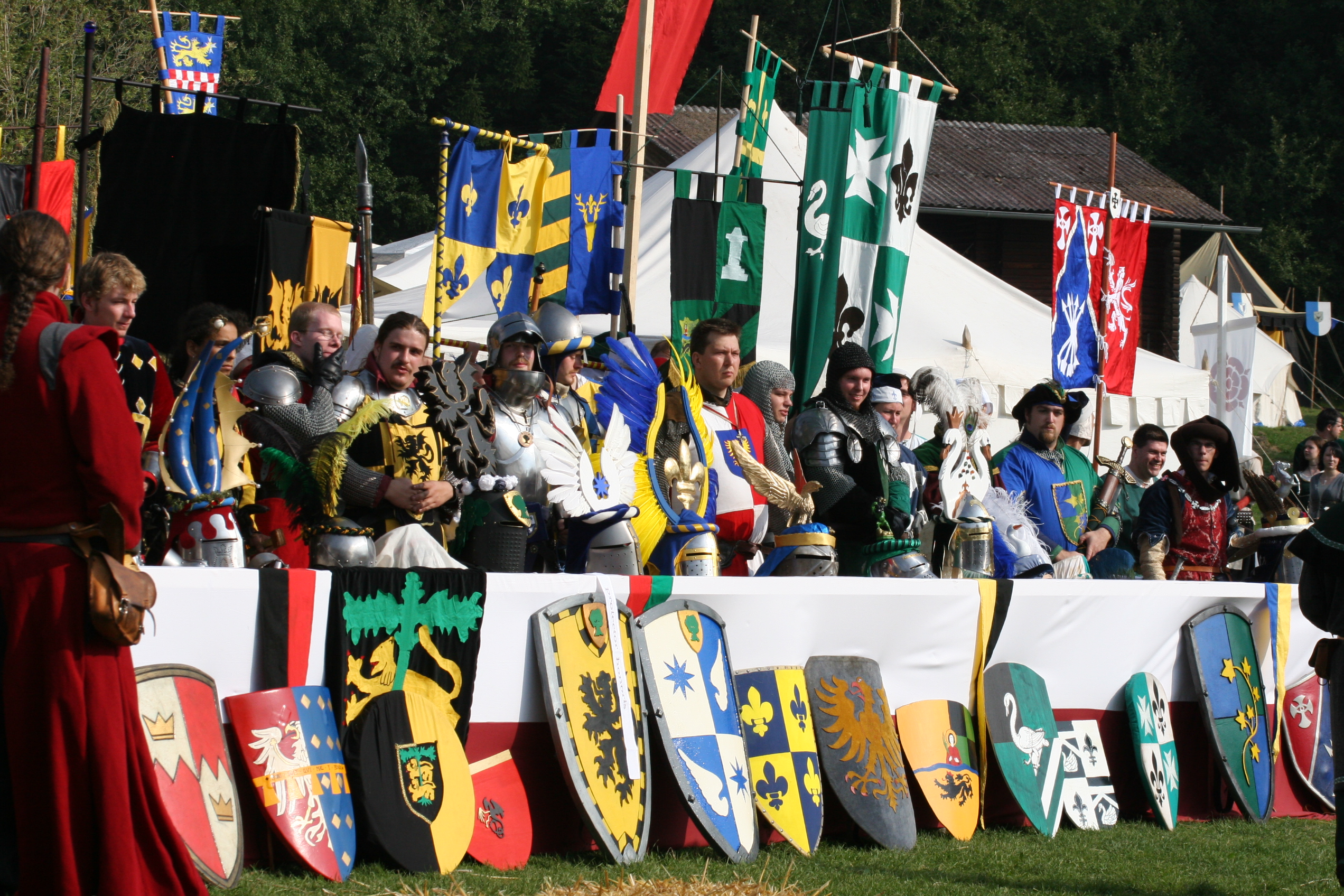
Knights at a German LARP (The Great Tourney, September 2005)

The history of German LARP is most easily found by going to the German LARP calendar,Larp Kalender

The first LARP that was catalogued is Samhain's Quest II (by Felix Völzmann today known as Maximus Sturm) on April 14, 1995, although Draccon 1 in 1991 is generally held to be the first event of significance. LarpWiki.de has a page on history.

The largest LARP events in Germany, which are also among the largest in the world, currently are the annual events "Conquest of Mythodea" and the "Drachenfest", with around 7000 and 5000 participants respectively.

== South African history ==
LARP in South Africa is mostly single evening events of fewer than four hours in length, with 8 to 20 players. Larger, longer-term campaigns are occasionally run, most using World of Darkness: Vampire.

There is a heavy emphasis on roleplaying. In the single evening events this means that there is little use of non player characters, costumes are the norm, and simple game mechanics are used. The standard conflict-resolution systems are symbolic, usually involving dice and very simplified character proficiency statistics. Special abilities are generally handled using cards that the player using the ability shows to those affected by it. Players are usually given detailed character sheets, sometimes of up to eight pages. These included background, goals and knowledge of other characters.

Cape Town is reputed to be the LARPing capital of South Africa, and there is a large archive of LARPs written by Capetonian designers (see under External Links). In recent years, there has been an increase in LARP activity in other communities, such as Johannesburg.

Large LARP events around Johannesburg known as MEAD happen every 3 months involving hundreds of players.

The Meadal Universe is based on the SOLAR system in America and is growing, having passed the 150 player mark recently. The LARP started in 2008, and is the longest-running LARP in South Africa.

In July 2011 a second boffer larp setting was created, Tales of Teana which also runs in Johannesburg, Gauteng. Tales of Teana is affiliated with MEAD, however the larp has a completely separate organization team and runs under the NERO International system in a world called Teana. Game-play takes place in the human kingdom of Arnhelm with the rest of the world largely inhabited by non-human races. The first Teana game was scheduled for April 2012.

== New Zealand history ==
New Zealand has an established and growing community of LARPers.

An assassin-style LARP was run by KAOS in 1981, and other LARPs have been run in New Zealand since the early-1980s, though at the time the term "wide game" or "council game" was generally used because the term LARP had not been introduced. "Live Dungeons" based on Dungeons & Dragons were run by Auckland University roleplaying clubs in the old military tunnels at North Head, Stoney Batter on Waiheke, and Shakespear Park on Whangaparaoa peninsula, from 1982 through to at least 1985. At NatCon 84 in Nelson, a game based around the ruling council of the city of New Pavis in Glorantha dealing with the approaching Lunar Army was run.

Several major events were held during the 1990s, the largest probably being the Aliens Apocalypse event run in 1999 as the culmination of a series of games based around the Aliens movies.

Several long-term campaigns have been and are currently running. Typical genres include vampire, medieval fantasy, science fiction (including popular single-evening events of live Paranoia and post-apocalyptic settings), horror, and 1920s/1930s gangsters.

Emphasis in long-term campaigns varies depends on the setting. For example, Mordavia is a medieval dark fantasy which emphasises roleplaying very strongly, where Skirmish is more combat-based, and games such as Vampire: The Requiem are strongly political.

Most games are non-contact using Mind's Eye Theatre or similar systems, whilst a few encourage live combat with foam weapons. Magical and other special effects are usually narrated, but are sometimes symbolised by reading of scrolls, throwing of spell packets, and circles outlined in rope for traps and magical portals. In a few one-off LARPS, significant special effects have been produced, often with the help of local professionals, such as Weta Workshop, and lighting and sound are often used to assist mood.

Level of costume varies. Large one-off games usually see a lot of work put in by players with appropriate skills, or professional costumes are hired or borrowed. In long-term campaigns, great care is often taken on player character costumes, as the character (personality, abilities, and background) will most often be invented by the player themselves. Non-player character costume is sometimes less detailed, but favourite monsters or villains may reappear frequently as they become well loved by the players.

There are LARP communities in all the major cities, especially Auckland and Wellington, and larps regularly feature at New Zealand roleplaying conventions. KapCon in Wellington has hosted large theatre-style games since 2001. There are also now larp-only conventions - Chimera in Auckland and Hydra in Wellington. These typically run both indoor theatre-style and outdoor live-combat games, with a large "flagship" event on the Saturday night to provide a unifying experience for all participants.

The New Zealand Live Action Role Playing Society is an umbrella organisation created to promote and support LARP throughout New Zealand. It is a parent organisation of Mordavia, and is affiliated with other groups such as Skirmish.
