= List of live action role-playing groups =

This is a list of live action role-playing game groups. This is for active or once active groups that run or organize games. It is not a list of game systems.

== A ==
- Amtgard - Fantasy boffer combat group in the United States, Croatia and Canada

== B ==
- Belegarth Medieval Combat Society - Fantasy boffer combat group in the United States and Canada
- Bicolline - Fantasy campaign with physical combat in Quebec

== C ==
- ConQuest of Mythodea - Regular fantasy fest event in Germany
- Curious Pastimes - Fantasy/Combat Fest based system (UK)

== D ==
- Dagorhir - Fantasy boffer combat group in the United States
- Darkon - Fantasy boffer combat group in the United States
- Drachenfest - Regular fantasy fest event in Germany
- Dragonbane - Large international fantasy game that ran in 2006 in Älvdalen, Sweden
- Dragoncrest - Fantasy boffer group in the United States
- Dystopia Rising - Post-apocalyptic zombie survival group in the United States

== F ==
- Fools and Heroes - High fantasy group in the UK with physical combat

== H ==
- Heroquest UK high fantasy LARP that uses a high hit system
- Herofest - UK fantasy LARP

== K ==
- Knight Realms - Fantasy Boffer LARP operating in Sparta, New Jersey, United States.

== L ==
- Labyrinthe - High fantasy, immersive Live Role-play (LRP) based at Chislehurst Caves, in the UK
- LAIRE - Fantasy LARP based in Sparta, New Jersey, United States
- The L.I.O.N.E. Rampant - LARP company based out of New England
- Lorien Trust - Fantasy physical combat system (UK)

== M ==
- MagiQuest - Family fantasy in USA, uses IR wands
- MeAd - Medieval Fantasy in Gauteng, South Africa

== N ==
- New England Interactive Literature - A group which promotes and organizes LARPs and LARP conventions in the New England area.
- NERO International - Fantasy boffer combat group the United States and Canada.
- New Zealand Live Action Role Playing Society - An umbrella organisation created to promote and support LARP throughout New Zealand.

== P ==
- Profound Decisions - professional LARP company running large fest games in the UK. Currently runs Empire, previously ran Maelstrom and Odyssey.

== R ==
- Realm of Requiem - Persistent Fantasy Boffer LARP operating in Charlton, Massachusetts, United States

== S ==
- Seventh Kingdom IGE - "Interactive Game Environment" based in New Jersey
- Shards of Orn - Fantasy boffer LARP based in Raleigh, NC
- Spearhead - Fantasy group in Guildford, UK

== T ==
- Treasure Trap - Multiple independent fantasy latex weapon combat groups (UK)

== U ==
- Underworld LARP - 18+ Horror/Fantasy boffer LARP based in Toronto, ON
