= Dave Wainwright =

British writer and musician

Dave Wainwright is a British science fiction comedy writer and is also co-founder, drummer, co-lyricist, and co-writer in the goth rock band Cauda Pavonis. He was born in Wolverhampton in the 20th century. His first novel was published December 8, 2008. The book was originally self-published through a print on demand service on 19 August 2008 but was picked up for publication in October 2008. Dave's history in the realms of literature before that were LARP oriented. He spent 3 years editing and producing a LARP fanzine in the 1990s called The Heart of Adventure. Whilst producing the fanzine and just after, he produced two LARP systems between 1996 and 1999. He also contributed to the first iteration of the Curious Pastimes, Renewal, LARP magic system in 1995—96.

As a drummer he was initially taught by Carl Stokes of Cancer (band) and later by Mick Kirton (one time stand in drummer for Hawkwind circa 1988 and The Groundhogs 1984-1989 amongst other work); before going on to define his own style.

He is currently working on the second book in the MultiVersal HelpDesk series and is writing another LARP system whilst continuing to write and gig with Cauda Pavonis.

== Works ==
- The MultiVersal HelpDesk v1.0 (2008) Lightning Press/Legend Press ISBN 978-1-84923-145-9
- The Heart of Adventure LARP Magazine (1995–1997)(co-editor with Rik Jones) Issues 1-12
- MAGEHOME LARP - Player's Primer (2011) Magehome Publishing
- MAGEHOME LARP - Atlas of Fendrua 611 (2011) Magehome Publishing
