= Curious Pastimes =

- Logo
- Founded: 1995
- Type: National business
- Location: England
- Services: Weekend fest events with up to 1200 participants
- Methods: Curious Pastimes (foam weapons)
- Field: High Fantasy
- Website: www.curiouspastimes.co.uk

Curious Pastimes (sometimes abbreviated to CuPa) is an organisation that runs one of the best-known live action role-playing campaigns in the UK. CuPa is a private, profit-making company headquartered in Moreton in the Wirral in Northern England. The company was formed in 1995, as a break-away group from the Lorien Trust.

Curious Pastimes' ongoing LARP campaign is called Renewal. The campaign uses its own set of LARP rules, of which a new 2nd edition has been released ahead of the 2025 campaign as part of an ongoing project to modernise the game. Renewal is a "Fest" Game, in which players interact with one another and with a small number of briefed non-player characters, climaxing in pre-arranged mass battles between roughly even numbers at the two longer events. These battles represent one of the major variations other Fest LARP games in the UK.

With up to c.1500 players attending their events, Renewal is one of the three main fest campaigns in the UK, alongside Lorien Trust and Profound Decisions' Empire.

== Events ==
The Renewal Campaign consists of four events each year, running from the May Bank Holiday weekend until the August Bank Holiday weekend. All the events take place across weekends, with those on the Bank Holiday weekends running until the Monday. Curious Pastimes also runs a system for formally approving smaller events (see below) staged by the various factions throughout the year.

The main events vary in size from 100 to 1500 people and present different aspects of the ongoing Renewal Campaign. The make up of these events vary year on year and each of the factions take turns in hosting the events, allowing them to bring a different look, feel and culture to each one, along with a bringing variety of in game plot and experiences.

From 2025, the events will be:

- Event 1 (May Bank Holiday weekend) is held at Paccar Scout Camp, just off the M25, near Slough.
- Event 2 (June) is held at Weston Park, near Telford
- Event 3 (July) is held at Paccar Scout Camp
- Event 4, Renewal (August Bank Holiday weekend) is held at Weston Park

A number of other sites have been used by Curious Pastimes since it was founded in 1995. The Renewal campaign has been run from Paccar Scout camp for over 10 years and the recent addition of Weston Park has provided a different feel to some of the events, with a more open layout in place of the closed glades of scout camps.

Curious Pastimes classes is as a "family-friendly" event, allowing parents to bring along children of any age. All children are entitled to full characters, though only those 16 or over are allowed to participate in the large-scale battles. Tailored young player plot and activities are run at every event for the different age groups to help them to learn the game and get involved.

=== Sanctioned Events ===
Curious Pastimes offers formal "sanctioning", allowing factions to run their own events within the ongoing Renewal storyline. Sanctioning provides the faction with permission to use the Curious Pastimes rules for privately run events. These events are also attended by a Sanctioning Referee that is there to oversee the event and ensure the event is run within the rules and world lore.

Anything that takes part during these events are considered part of the game world and events have taken place as such. If an event isn't sanctioned by Curious Pastimes, it is considered as outside of the game and actions taken at these events do not happen in game.

== The Game World ==
The game's setting is a unique unnamed fantasy world. The world is largely based on the real world with inspiration taken from a variety of different places. The known, populated continent that hosts the majority of player characters and their communities is a temperate-to-subarctic landmass broadly equivalent to Eurasia.

The factions have explored wider than their continent and are due to be joined by new people from the western continent as part of their alliance.

Historically, there have been nine intelligent humanoid races in the CuPa setting: humans, elves, dark elves, dwarves, four "greenskin" races (orcs, ogres, goblins, and trolls), and a variety of animal-human hybrids collectively known as beastmen. All are more or less evenly-distributed across the world's population (and thus player base), with some variation among the different factions. A number of players have also created bespoke characters that do not fit neatly into the races set out by the game.

As part of the release of the CuPa 2nd edition rules, unlike other fantasy games that have changed race to species, the concept of races has been removed from the game completely. CuPa have been clear that they wanted to step away from the idea of set races, which often come with challenging and problematic stereotypes. At Curious Pastimes, you are now able to create more wide ranging characters and let your imagination run wild. Of course, if you want to play an elf or a goblin, you can absolutely still do that, but the game will use the names associated with your culture rather than the terms 'elf' or 'goblin'.

=== Factions ===
The known continent is populated by a number of monarchies, nation-states and confederations known as Factions, modelled very loosely on various real-world historical communities, with influences from fantasy literature, films and other sources, as well as original ideas. The majority of player characters belong to one or other faction, with the exception of a group of non-aligned players collectively labelled "mercenaries." The factions range in size and are generally seen as the travelling warhost for their home nations.

In real-world terms, each faction is run by a small Command Team of three referees, assigned by CuPa. This team oversee the running of the faction (both in and out of character), support the players and write the plot for their faction to interact with at events. This team is usually supported by a team of six faction referees. Many of the factions host websites for their members and manage social media pages, and several of them stage small-scale "sanctioned" events set in the Renewal continuity. At events, members of a faction camp together; the factions' communal In-Character camps are the major focus of the game, with attacks against fortified camps and diplomatic missions between camps providing much of the storyline at each event.

Within the broad faction concepts stated above may be found a broad spectrum of characters, from the comical to the serious, from a range of historical (or pseudo-historical) backgrounds, and from the mean and humble to the high-heroic. Formally, Renewal is an "Open World" campaign setting, so players are permitted to submit any concept they wish, with the exception that neither gunpowder-weapons nor any more advanced technology are permitted.

The factions are:

- Algaia – Largely based on French / Italian noble houses and high fantasy, creatures with fae-like heritage, driven by politics or the natural cycle.
- Fir Cruthen – Their look and feel is inspired by the different celtic nations from UK history with a full pantheon of Gods that walk the earth and interact with their players.
- Jhereg – This is a faction of pragmatists that love to wield both magics and information. Based around Siberia, they have a great mix of societies and believe in protecting their own, whatever they believe.
- The Lions – Based in Albion and inspired by realms, monarchs and knights, Chivalry, Duty, Truth, Law and Honour are central to their way of life.
- Kabourashi – A brand new faction for 2025, made up of 3 nations. The Xanakawe live in harmony with their spiritual guides, Kinshara see loyalty to one's oath is paramount and Akesh who revere the unity of Family above all else. Moving away from European centric cultures, expect colour and flamboyance.
- Mercenaries – a melting pot of diversity, drawing individuals from all walks of life, those looking to hire their skills out to the highest bidder.
- Teutonia – Inspired by a mix of German, Roman and Greek cultures, highly moral pragmatists who make deals with demons and the undead in broad daylight
- Steppe Alliance – Free people with no true leaders, with inspiration taken from Mongol and traveller culture. Bringing colour and vibrancy, they show reverence of their ancestors and the Mother, respecting the land on which they live.
- Wolves – Viking-inspired Norsca is a land of ice, where high peaks and snowy plains lead to an existence of hardship. The people of the land are proud to live in such a harsh climate; indeed they welcome it.

== See also ==
- Live action role-playing game
- List of live action role-playing groups
