= David Wainwright =

David Wainwright may refer to:

- David Wainwright (Yorkshire cricketer) (born 1985), English cricketer
- Dave Wainwright, British science fiction comedy writer
