= Cauda Pavonis =

English gothic rock band

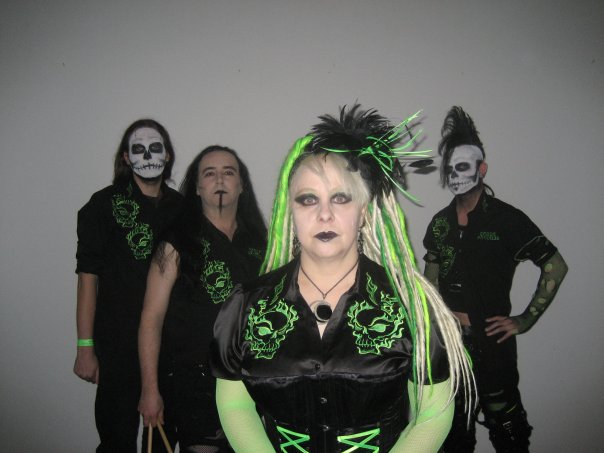
- Cauda Pavonis, Taken in Bremen, Germany

Background information
- Origin: Bristol, England
- Genres: Gothic rock; deathrock; post-punk; punk rock
- Years active: 1998–present
- Labels: FAW4 Records; CPX Records
- Members: Su Wainwright; Dave Wainwright; Steve Mercy; Jon Gould
- Past members: Jessica Phoenix; Tom Cole; Rob Quick; Adam Henderson; Cord Frazer; Chris Hines
- Website: www.caudapavonis.com

Cauda Pavonis are an English gothic rock band founded in 1998, by Su Farr (later Wainwright) and Dave Wainwright. Originally conceived as a 'dark romantic' experience, Cauda Pavonis broke onto the UK goth circuit supporting acts such as Star Industry and Inkubus Sukkubus. At the outset Cauda Pavonis were noted for their consciously-minimalist synthesized melodies and their use of live drums (uncommon during the late 1990s in UK goth music). They were described by Mick Mercer in his book 21st Century Goth as a "Dark duo from UK with a bright future" and by Starvox as "The most old school sounding goth since Rozz Williams hung himself". Since then the line-up has grown and the band have appeared twice at the Whitby Gothic Weekend (2001, 2008) and the Wave-Gotik-Treffen. In 2003 and again in 2007, Cauda Pavonis were the focus of the ITV television programme, Magick Eve.

== History ==
Formed in 1998 Cauda Pavonis concentrated on writing — it was not until 1999 that they made their debut at the two-day festival Distopia 2, held at the Bristol Bierkeller. Between the 2000 Pistols at Dawn album and the 2001 Controversial Alchemy album, the band was fairly quiet as in September 2000 the band's tour schedule came to a halt when Farr broke her ankle. Across 2001 and 2003 they continued to tour, taking their album Controversial Alchemy across the UK.

In 2003, the line-up was augmented by Chris Hines on guitars, and they gigged as a three-piece until the album Sigil was recorded. Shortly after the production of Sigil the band went back to the studio, and recorded two tracks for the TV show Magick Eve which the band then performed on the show.

By 2005, the band had grown to a four-piece and released the EP Carnival Noir which was critically acclaimed by Mick Mercer in a full page article in his periodical The Mick, along with a full page spread in Germany's Gothic magazine. In 2005 Cauda Pavonis produced their first music video for Carnival Noir. This was filmed in the Full Moon with a group of friends and other members of the UK goth community.

In 2006 the German rock band Chudoku added a cover of "Love Like Broken Glass" from the album Controversial Alchemy to their live show.

Between 2001 and 2006 the band were responsible for running regular live gig nights in Bristol at The Full Moon pub in Stokes Croft. These nights opened the South West gig circuit up to several unsigned goth bands and DJs. The nights stopped in 2006 when the venue fell out of alternative hands and was turned into a backpackers lodge.

The band spent much of 2011 and 2014 supporting Chameleons Vox, and Simon Hinkler (The Mission). The also became a regular support act on Toyah album retrospective tours. During 2011 they released a single for the Forgotten Heroes charity.

In 2012, they were first amongst their peers to use the Pledgemusic website to crowdfund their album Peace Through Superior Firepower. 2012 also saw Adam Henderson (founding member and formerly of Inkubus Sukkubus) join the band as bass player and who stayed with them until April 2015 when he left to continue his own musical projects.

In 2013, the band made it into print, aside from several previous magazine interviews between 1999 and 2013, by being featured in the co-authored work by Liz Williams and Trevor Jones, Diary of a Witchcraft Shop 2.

In 2015, they produced their first download only EP, 'The Devil's Looking Glass'. This was unique in that it was not only delivered via a digital download card but that card itself was set in a Presentation Sleeve (a slightly oversized CD style square sleeve) to appeal to 'downloaders and collectors alike'. This appears to be the first production of such a presented format by a band.

In 2023 the band celebrated 25 years of touring and music production with a new release and a tour.

=== Current line up ===
- Su Wainwright (formerly Farr) - Words, Music, Vocals, Programming; 1998–present
- Dave Wainwright - Words, Music, Drums, Vocals; 1998–present
- Steve Mercy - Bass; 2018–present
- Jon Gould - Guitarist; 2021–present

=== Former members ===
- Jessica Phoenix - Bass; 2004–2005
- Tom Cole - Bass; 2005–2006
- Rob Quick - Bass; 2008–2012
- Adam Henderson - Bass; 2012–2015
- Cord Frazer - Bass; 2015–2016
- Chris Hines - Rhythm guitarist; 2003–2021

== Discography ==
=== CD releases ===
- Initiation (CD:EP) 1999
- Pistols at Dawn (CD:LP) 2000
- Controversial Alchemy (CD:LP) 2001
- Sigil (CD:LP) 2003
- Carnival Noir (CD:EP) 2005
- Wars & Masquerades (CD:LP) 2008
- Peace Through Superior Firepower (CD:LP) 2012
- Saturnalia (CD:EP) 2013
- Aces & Eights (CD:LP) 2018

=== Digital downloads ===
- Sigil (LP) 2006
- Carnival Noir (EP) 2006
- Wars & Masquerades (LP) 2008
- Retrology Volume 1:Early Years [remastered] (LP) 2010
- Retrology Volume 2:Tyburn Jigs and Demo Reels 2010 (EP) 2010
- Forgotten Heroes (SP) 2011
- Peace Through Superior Firepower (LP) 2012
- Terror in the Nursery [single version] (SP) 2013
- Saturnalia (EP) 2013
- The Devil's Looking Glass (EP) 2015
- Retrology Volume 3:East of the Sunset (EP) 2016
- Retrology:Triptych (LP) 2017
- Aces & Eights (LP) 2018
- The Devil, The Reaper and The Highwayman (EP) 2023
- 25th Anniversary Collector's (Digital Box Set (44 tracks)) 2023

=== Compilations ===
- State of Decay Cat:NEONCD1 2000
- Dance of the Vampires 2 - THE RESURRECTION Cat: Goth AId 2002
- Carpe Noctum New Blood Volume 1 Cat: CNOCCD001 2002
- Now That's What I Call Elviras Cat: elvcd4bd 2003
- Sick Twisted Individual Volume 1 Cat: Night CD51 (NightBreed Records) 2003
- Insanitorium: Heckling From the Cheap Seats 2003
- New Dark Age Volume 2 (Strobelight Records) 2004
- Gospels from your Stereo (Strobelight Records) 2006
- In The Dark Of Night Cat: IM-DON01 (Insomnia Media) 2008
- Till Dawn Do Us Part 08 Cat: None 2008
- Shock Kulture Vol 1 2009
- Gothic Sounds of NIghtbreed 5 2009
- Gothic Pogo Compilation 2012
- Rock4Spin Compilation 2013
- Silver Heart Rocks Volume 1 2014

=== Download only compilations ===
- Quintesenz 2012 AFMusic 2012
- Gothic Rock Around the World Sombratti Records 2012
- Gothic Rock Around the World V Sombratti Records 2013
- 33 Goth Bands You Should Know V Gothic Music Records 2017
- The British Post-Gothic You Should Know Gothic Music Records 2017
- She is The Dark Gothic Music Records 2018

=== Cover discs ===
- Kaleidoscope 7 Cat: Kaleidoscope 7 (cover CD) 2000
- Kaleidoscope 10 Cat: Kaleidoscope 10 (cover CD) 2001
- TWF Magazine 5 (cover CD) 2005
- Insomnia Magazine 1 (cover CD) 2006
- Insomnia Magazine 2 (cover CD) 2006
- Gothic Compilation Part XXXVI (DE)(Batbeliever Releases) 2007
- Unscene Magazine 4 (cover CD) 2007
- TWF Magazine 8 (cover CD) 2007
- Synthetics Magazine 77 (cover CD) 2007
- Crawling Tunes Magazine 6 (cover CD) 2007
- Insomnia Magazine Jan/Feb 08 (cover CD) 2007
- Unscene Magazine 7 (cover CD) 2009
- Devolution Magazine 29 (cover CD) 2011
- Devolution Magazine 32 (cover CD) 2012
- Unscene Magazine 10 (cover CD) 2012
- Alt Female Voices 5 (cover CD) 2013
- TBFM Magazine 25 (cover CD) 2015
- Devolution Magazine 39 (cover CD) 2015
- Devolution Magazine 40 (cover CD) 2016
- Devolution Magazine 41 (cover CD) 2016
- Devolution Magazine 42 (cover CD) 2017
- Devolution Magazine 43 (cover CD) 2018
- Devolution Magazine 44 (cover CD) 2018
- Devolution Magazine 50 (cover CD) 2022
- Devolution Magazine 53 (cover CD) 2023
- Devolution Magazine 54 (cover CD) 2024

=== Videography ===
- Bloodkiss [Magick Eve version] (2004)
- Carnival Noir (2006)
- Love Like Broken Glass [Live at Whitby Gothic Weekend 2008] (2008)
- Controversial Alchemy [Live at Whitby Gothic Weekend 2008] (2008)
- Saturnalia (2013)
- Terror in the Nursery (Live Acoustic 2014) (2014)
- 11th Hour (Live Acoustic 2014) (2015)
- Love Like Broken Glass [across the years version] (2015)
- I am a Monster [live cut promo video] (2017)
- Aces & Eights Lyric Video (2018)

=== DJ Promos ===
- Wardance [s.u.b. version] (2002)
- Tying the Knot (2005)
- Terror in the Nursery [single version] (2013)
- The Devil, The Reaper and The Highwayman (2023)

== TV ==
=== Magick Eve; ITV1. April 2004 ===
In 2003, Cauda Pavonis were approached to feature in one of ITV's Magick Eve episodes presented by Emma Jane Portch, this particular episode was focused on the Gothic subculture. Initially filming was undertaken in November 2003, and appropriately filmed at night within the incomplete Victorian Woodchester Mansion, Gloucestershire. Other filming locations included Twilight Fashions a Goth/Fetish shop (closed 2016) and St. Nicolas Market, Bristol, The Full Moon (since closed and renamed 'the Attic'), Bristol and The Hatchett Inn, Bristol. The program was screened in April 2004 and repeated in March/April 2008 on the UK ITV network.

=== True Horror with Anthony Head; Discovery Channel. 17 November 2004 ===
Filmed in August 2004 and presented by Anthony Head, Cauda Pavonis appeared in an episode of True Horror along with other members of the Goth community. This episode investigated the mythology and history of vampires and was partly filmed on the Il Bordello, a floating bar/restaurant (since renamed 'the Apple' and under new ownership) located on Bristol Harbour.

In 2014 the band's track 'Love Like Broken Glass' was used on Czech TV in a program about the Gothic Subculture.
