= The Fair Fight =

2014 novel by Anna Freeman

- Author: Anna Freeman
- Genre: historical fiction
- Publisher: Weidenfeld & Nicolson, Penguin Random House, Riverhead Books
- Publication date: 2014
- Publication place: United Kingdom

The Fair Fight is a novel by British author Anna Freeman. The novel is set in Bristol and London in the 1820s, featuring a female boxer who grew up in a brothel.

== About the work ==
The story is told through three narrators. Ruth's story begins when she is 10 and her mother, who runs a brothel, charges men to watch Ruth and her older sister fight. Ruth's skill is impressive, and one of the men, Mr Dryer, trains up to be a boxer with frequent fights at the Hatchet Inn. George is the second narrator. He is an upper-class man without independent funds, who became friends with Mr Dryer at school. Charlotte, the third narrator, marries Mr Dryer, but also develops an interest in boxing.

The Fair Fight was first published in London in 2014 by Weidenfeld & Nicolson, and by Riverhead Books in the US in 2015.

== Reception ==
A reviewer in The New York Times praised Freeman's used of "informal archaic" English, noting that it is notoriously difficult to write a historical fiction that sounds authentic yet is comprehensible to modern readers. The reviewer writes that Freeman "skillfully beds in the idiom while staring us boldly in the face", a skill that the reviewer attributes to her experience as a slam poet. The Express calls it a "lively, rambunctious read". It was also reviewed by The Times, whose reviewer called Charlotte's redemption through boxing "a delightfully untypical plot device for a historical novel", and it was long-listed for The Guardian's Not the Booker Prize.
