= Jubensha =

Live action mystery game

Jubensha (Chinese: 剧本杀; pinyin: Jùběnshā), also known as script murder games, are a Chinese genre of live action role-playing (LARP) murder mystery game. This genre became popular in China in the late 2010s and has been described as a "mix of Cluedo, Werewolf and LARP".

== Format ==
Typically, script murder games can be experienced as a tabletop game, or in a format that combines live action role-playing (LARP) with an escape room experience. Players are given different script options and are assigned characters to play through the murder mystery; these games often occur at dedicated gaming stores where players pay to participate. Games often unfold in three to five hourlong sessions with four to twelve players.

The market for the genre is highly "fragmented and complex, with per-person prices for a game ranging from tens to thousands of yuan (a few United States dollars to a few hundred). High-quality scripts are expensive; piracy and market infringement run rampant; and ultra-low-priced scripts are everywhere". In 2021, the Xinhua News Agency stated that there are seven main genres of jubensha games: hardcore scripts, reconstruction scripts, fun scripts, horror scripts, emotional scripts, factional scripts, and mechanism scripts.

== History ==
Academic Yuqiao Liu, in the International Journal of Role-Playing, noted that script murder games initially originated in the West with games, such as Death Wears White in 2013, that were translated into Chinese. The genre "grew rapidly in China's role-playing game market" and the term jubensha (lit. 'scripted murder') was coined then. The style become popularized in 2015 "when reality shows with names like 'Lying Man,' 'Dinner Party Seduction,' and later 'Who's The Murderer,' showed celebrities playing whodunits" which led to the development of jubensha clubs that run games in this style. Jubensha scholar Rouyu Wen of Huazhong University of Science and Technology and Uppsala University stated that "while live-action roleplaying games are often a niche phenomenon in the West, it is almost as mainstream as digital games in China".

In 2021, state-run media said there were around 6,500 jubensha companies registered in China, a rise of more than 60% from 2020. During the COVID-19 pandemic, "Murder Mystery Game" (MMG) apps allowed people to play jubensha digitally. Following the easing of pandemic restrictions in China, more than 45,000 jubensha shops opened with nearly 10 million active players. It was estimated that the market would reach 23.89 billion Chinese Yuan (3 billion US dollars). Chinese market research firm iResearch reported in 2021 that script murder games had become the third most popular form of entertainment for Chinese people, behind watching movies and playing sports. A 2021 report on physical jubensha consumers in China found that nearly 75% of them were under 30, and over 60 percent of players took part in two or more jubensha games per month. Vogue Business viewed the success of the "substantial market" as "based on high-quality content" and young people with a "huge appetite for suspense-driven interactive narratives where the players themselves take control". In 2022, jubensha venues in Singapore began to expand with scripts that originated in China; these games are either run in Chinese or with scripts translated into English.

== Regulation ==
The popularization of script murder games and industry growth in China has led to both national and governmental attention with the Chinese government considering formal regulation of the industry. An August 2020 report from China National Radio found that although some people were pleased that the games were encouraging young people to socialise face-to-face, others expressed concern that many of the scripts relied on violent and sexual content. By October 2021, jubensha was becoming more mainstream and widely advertised, leading to discussion of possible regulation.

In October 2022, regulation of mature content was introduced by municipal and provincial authorities, leading some store owners to remove certain game materials from sale. Shanghai became the first city in mainland China to regulate LARP murder mystery games in 2022, and the Shanghai Public Security Bureau has since arrested jubensha operators who committed intellectual property violations with pirated scripts. In 2023 China's Ministry of Culture and Tourism began to draft regulations for script murder games, and solicited public opinions on the issue. The draft regulations state that "the contents of such games must not smear the traditional Chinese culture or contain inappropriate materials involving obscenity, gambling, drugs, and other elements that could go against moral standards". The regulations also include additional rules for minors such as not allowing "underage customers on school days" and that "children under the age of 14 must be accompanied by their parents or other guardians".
