= Chimera (larp convention) =

Live action role-playing convention in New Zealand

- Status: Defunct
- Genre: Larp
- Venue: Motu Moana Scout Camp
- Location: Auckland
- Country: New Zealand
- Inaugurated: 2008
- Attendance: 150+
- Website: http://chimera.nzlarps.org/

Chimera was a Live action role-playing (LARP) convention held annually every August in Auckland, New Zealand. The convention was supported by the New Zealand Live Action Role Playing Society. It was the largest event of its type in New Zealand, attracting over 150 people. It did not have guests of honour.

The convention supported different styles of play, including live-combat and theatre-style games. It hosted a single large "flagship" game to provide a unifying experience for attendees.

== List of conventions ==
- 2008: Motu Moana, Auckland (Flagship: Flight of the Hindenberg)
- 2009: Motu Moana, Auckland (Flagship: The Great Exhibition)
- 2010: Motu Moana, Auckland (Flagship: A Town Called Refuge)
- 2011: Motu Moana, Auckland (Flagship: The Gordian Knot)
- 2012: Motu Moana, Auckland (Flagship: Happily Ever After)
- 2013: Motu Moana, Auckland (Flagship: The Rose and the Dragon)
- 2014: Motu Moana, Auckland (no flagship)
