= NERO International =

Live action role-playing game

- Type: Live action role-playing game
- Headquarters: Barnesville, Georgia, United States
- Website: NeroLarp.com

NERO International is a live action role-playing game (LARP) played in the United States. The NERO name originally was an acronym for "New England Role playing Organization", but the game has expanded well beyond its original New England roots and thus simply adopted the acronym as part of the official name.

NERO is a lightest touch "boffer" style LARP that uses simulated combat with padded weapons. At a NERO event, players gather at a group campsite (often a State or National Park) on weekends reserved by the local chapter. A group of staff members write the plot and story for the event, while a cast of volunteer NPCs play the roles of monsters and townspeople. The heroes of the event (or Player characters called PCs), play participate in the event.

Over the course of an event, characters earn treasure in the form of fake gold and silver coins, magical components, or enchanted items through battle with fantasy monsters and by solving puzzles or other challenges. Characters also earn experience points for surviving the weekend which they can use to buy more skills and become more powerful.

== History ==
While running his store in 1986, Ford Ivey became interested in the new hobby of Live-Action Role-Playing (LARPing). Ivey heard of a role-playing game in New Hampshire called Midrealms Adventures that was played outdoors, where participants dressed up like their player characters. However, when he participated in it, he was disappointed. In a 2001 interview, he said, "It was not a lot like what I imagined. It was a module-based game — a few hours and it was over, and a marshal had to be with you all the time."

Ivey decided to try out some new ideas. At the time he was running a role-playing game for a Boy Scouts Explorer group, and had access to a Boy Scout camp at Nobscot Hill. With several friends, Ivey planned out what such a new type of outdoor role-playing adventure would involve. Ivey scripted the game, bought some costumes for the non-player characters, and ran the event that he called Weekend Warriors for six players. This event was, in Ivey's words, "pretty bad", but he persevered, and offered the event several more times. After one of these events, he was approached by several participants — Craig and Debbie Walton, Mike Ventrella, Heidi Hooper, and Bob King — who suggested some changes to the format, including a storyline that would be driven by the non-player characters rather than a marshal, leaving the players free to explore the plot-lines of the event themselves. In March 1988 they began to work on the idea that instead of each event being a separate game with separate characters and a single linear plot-line, there would be a single game world, players would have persistent characters, and the campaign would have multiple overlapping and long-term plotlines.

That summer, with a much-improved product, the group presented a 24-hour LARP called Shandlin's Ferry. Its success led Ivey and the other organizers to create an on-going LARP campaign called the New England Role-playing Organization (NERO), based on the same principles of play that had been used in Shandlin's Ferry. The world they created was called Tyrra — roughly analogous to Earth — and the campaign events happened on the continent of Avalon. In a 2012 interview, Ivey outlined how NERO had developed the idea of LARPing, saying, "Live role-playing started in England, where there are a lot of medieval reenactment societies, but what we do is a fantasy game." The first NERO event was held in August 1989, and attracted 150 participants. By 1991, attendance at regularly scheduled summer weekend events was up to 300–500 participants. Ivey sold his store to NERO, which became their central headquarters.

In 1991, one of the NERO organizers, Mike Ventrella, wrote an article about NERO that appeared in the September 1991 issue of Dragon. Suddenly, paid memberships increased to 5,000, and NERO eventually expanding to chapters in New Jersey and Atlanta. NERO closed the store's sales space in order to use the entire building for event planning. The largest NERO event location became the "Duchy of Ravenholt", where Ivey would oversee feasts and celebrations in the role of Duke Basil Ravenhurst.

On September 1, 1991, the Nero games were formally incorporated under Legends Unlimited, Inc, under the ownership of Ford Ivey and Michael Ventrella. Under Legends Unlimited, Nero expanded to over 9 National Chapters running games under the Nero rules. Legends Unlimited, Inc was active until August 31, 1998.

In 1998, Joseph Valenti purchased NERO from Ivey and began selling franchise licenses to people who wished to open and operate a local chapter in their area. After taking a break from gaming for a few years for health reasons, Ford Ivey would return to designing LARPs.

Over the years, a number of chapters or groups of chapters have broken away from NERO to form their own, separate organizations. Among these are LAIRE, Alliance LARP, and Heroic Interactive Theater.

== The Tyrran Campaign Setting ==
The setting of NERO is the world of Tyrra, a medieval fantasy world. The normal NERO campaign is set on the continent of Avalon. The world map of Tyrra very roughly resembles Earth, with Avalon being in the position of North America. Other continents generally only appear as elements of rumor and lore, or as the source of travelers (or enemies) from afar.

== See also ==
- List of live action role-playing groups
- Monster Camp
