= Fools and Heroes =

British live-action role playing system

- Founded: 1985
- Type: Non-profit clubs
- Location: United Kingdom (at one point, also Spain)
- Services: Weekend small-scale events all over the UK, many small branch events and one annual fest event
- Methods: Proprietary (foam weapons)
- Field: High fantasy
- Website: www.foolsandheroes.org

Fools and Heroes (also called FnH) is a non-profit fantasy live-action role-playing game (LARP) which was started in the autumn of 1985 by John Naylor, who placed a small advertisement looking for players in TableTop Games, Daybrook Nottingham. The first events were run in 1986 and the rules system was written and published by John Naylor and Steve Bell in 1986, by which point the national branch structure had already been established. The Society is democratic in nature and has multiple branches around the country. Most branches contain 15–20 members who play at least once a month, though some have as many as thirty. Members can travel between branches allowing them to play in various areas and interact in different plotlines. There are also yearly gatherings which involve multiple branches simultaneously, the largest of which is the Summerfest.

== Format ==
At present there are twenty FnH branches across the UK (there was a Spanish branch operating at Barcelona from November 2017 to November 2018). Each branch elects a volunteer to act as Liaison Officer (LO) who is responsible for the administration of the branch. The LO also represents the branch's opinions on rules issues and various other topics during national meetings. Each branch also has referees who are responsible for running adventures.

Most branches run sessions at least once a month, some as frequently as once a week. Most sessions consist of two adventures over a single day, members will play one game as their character and act as "monsters" in the other game. The advantage of this play style is that, unlike systems where dedicated crew teams must be employed, Fools and Heroes sessions have relatively low operating costs. Other than an annual society membership fee to cover administration costs there is typically no charge to attend these sessions.

Every branch has its own plot, controlled by a team of referees. There is also a "national" plotline that all branches can take part in, this is controlled by volunteers elected from the society in general.

Fools and Heroes main event is Summerfest, which runs the weekend of the bank holiday in August, and was the first LARP to break the 1000-attendee mark in the early 1990s. It is a four-day event with on site camping and generally allows players to finish a national plot line that has been running over the previous 12 months. Once again because of the format of missions the operating costs of these fests are lower than usual: even large Fools and Heroes events such as this one cost relatively little to attend.

== Combat ==
FnH uses foam and latex weapons designed for use in live role play to ensure players' safety. As an additional precaution players are asked not to aim for the head and to pull their blows.

The combat system is referred to as location based; to reduce bookkeeping to a minimum during battles all weapons deal a single point of damage. To determine the effects of this the body is separated into locations, two arms, two legs, torso, and head. Each location on a standard human has one hit point and if damaged must be healed before being able to be used again. Wounds to the head or body are known as lethal wounds, which cause unconsciousness and lead to death if untreated.

== System ==
A player is allowed one character, a player character or PC. A PC is usually a member of a professional guild or a church following one of several gods. Their abilities depend on their position within their guild or church, which advances automatically after the character has played missions during a specific number of months. Players are also allowed to play special characters, those that do not fit into the standard rules set, which must be vetted by the society before starting play.

== Game Setting ==
FnH is a medieval fantasy game, drawing inspiration from Warhammer Fantasy, Dungeons & Dragons, The Lord of the Rings and various other fictional and historical sources. The world itself is based on our own but countries and cities have different names, for example the equivalent of England is called "Ithron", Lancashire is called "Lanshore", Newcastle is called "Newcroft" and York is renamed "Eboracum" as it was in the Roman times. A fictional country named "Axir" exists, it is the home of the Axirian Empire, based strongly on the Roman Empire (originally influenced by Grecian culture) and with a similarly strong influence over the FnH world.

== Races ==
Members may play characters from any of the standard fantasy races, provided they are willing and able to physically represent ("physrep") this appropriately (for example, those wishing to play and Elf must wear pointed ears). Nonhuman races possess varying natural abilities, and conversely suffer varying amounts of discrimination. An example of this is that certain professional guilds may disallow non-human members.

Additional unique characters such as goblins, half-orcs and fey are permissible, though such variants must be approved by senior referees.

== Classes ==
Fools and Heroes has three different concepts which are analogous to character classes in other games.

Most characters will be members of at least one of the eight guilds. Guilds are most similar to character classes in other games; advancement within the guilds allows PCs access to different skills.

The Guild of Scouts allows the finding of traps and tracking footprints. They usually wear leather armour.

The Guild of Mercenaries are the front line of a battle, protecting their allies and usually suited with metal armour.

The Guild of Alchemists spend their time away from adventures (known as downtime) brewing potions for use in the field. Some typical potions include those used to heal a wound instantly, to protect yourself from a single blow, or even become invisible for a short time.

The Guild of Blacksmiths, much like Alchemists, use their downtime to make armour and weapons for adventurers, but they can also repair armour out in the field, making them very useful in a tough fight.

The Guild of Physicians are the medicinal healers of the FnH world. Using their different medicines, they can heal wounds, stitch up cuts, and even reattach a severed limb. Physicians are worth their weight in gold on any party.

The Law Guild ensures that the laws of Ithron, are followed at all times. Guards, who are found in cities, and Foresters, who are usually in the wilds, can issue arrest warrants, check adventurers for their permits, and also declare people Outlawed.

Secondly, there are seven Churches of the Gods of the light which PC's may join. PC's may choose the level to which they devote themselves to their God. They may be lay worshippers, known as Kindred, join the martial arm of the church known as the Devoted, or join the Priesthood itself. Each level of worship carries its own set of responsibilities and benefits.

The Gods are as follows:

Vleybor - Goddess of Redemption, Fertility and Peace.

Kharach - God of Death, Mercy and Patience.

Longstor - God of Nature and the Eternal Cycle.

Sidhe - God of Truth, Justice and Fairness. Father to the other Gods.

Tralda - Goddess of Luck, Fate and the Downtrodden.

Rolbor - God of Knowledge, Trade and Wealth.

Crowa - Goddess of Battle and Protection.

Thirdly, there are four Knightly Orders of Ithron, all of which serve the church of Sidhe, the god of justice, to a greater or lesser degree.

There are also 6 Dark Gods, which a Player Character may never be a follower of, these are:

Seraklan - God of Deceit and Trickery, opposite to Tralda

Fygol - Goddess of Greed and Waste, opposite to Rolbor

Bequifus - Goddess of Pain, Revenge and Torture, opposite to Kharach

Githas - God of Vanity and Pride, opposite to Vleybor

Abraxis - God of Slaughter and Treachery, opposite to Crowa

Krygan - Goddess of Monsters and Corruption, opposite to Longstor
