= Hatchet Inn, Bristol =

Hatchet Inn
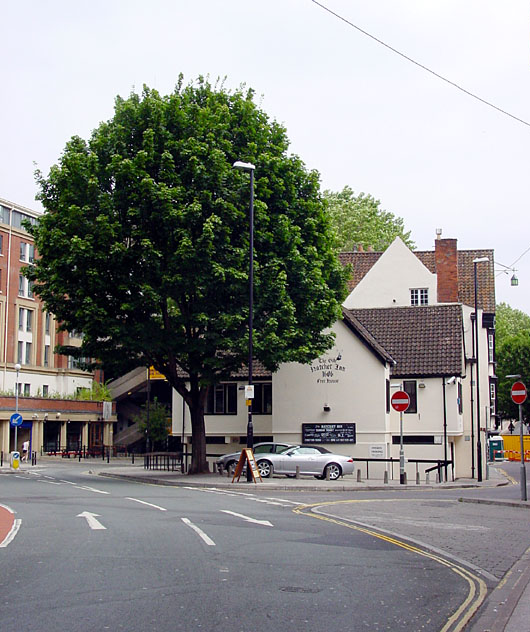
- The Hatchet Inn

- Location within Bristol

General information
- Location: Bristol, England
- Coordinates: 51.45389°N 2.60039°W
- Completed: c. 1500

Website
- www.jwbpubs.com/pubs/the-hatchet-inn

The Hatchet Inn is a historic pub in the English city of Bristol. It is a Grade II listed building. The name is thought to originate from the axes/hatchets that the local woodsmen used in Clifton Woods.

The building dates from 1606, but has undergone significant alteration since and is a grade II listed building. It is the oldest still operating pub in Bristol, though while it was still operating the Llandoger Trow was of a similar age.

Since the 1980s the Hatchet has been known as one of Bristol's few alternative pubs hosting rock music upstairs. The pub has a pool room located upstairs as well as a venue which is used for clubs and can be hired for private bookings. There is a beer garden located on the side of the property, facing the O2 Academy venue.

Located behind the pub was the old Cannon Cinema, which closed down in 2000. The building is now an Academy Night Club/gig venue where many well known bands have played.

In the 18th century there was a rat pit at the rear of the building. In September 2006 the Hatchet celebrated its 400-year anniversary. The streets nearby were closed, staff and some regular customers dressed up in historic costumes.

The Hatchet was acquired by the Liberation Group (owners of Butcombe Brewery) in 2017 but was shut in March 2020 due to the first nationwide COVID-19 lockdown. Jon Bassett, owner of JW Bassett Pubs, signed a 20 year lease in May 2021 and spent £500,000 on renovations, before reopening The Hatchet to the general public on 28 June 2021.

== In popular culture ==
The Hatchet Inn is one of the locations in which the novel The Fair Fight by Anna Freeman is set. The Hatchet Inn is also the palace from where the pirate Samuel Bellamy started his trip from England to Cape Cod in Alexander De Chastelaine's novel Black Sam.

In local Bristol culture, there is an enduring urban legend that the wooden front door of the establishment is wrapped in human skin, under hundreds of years of paint.
