= New Zealand Live Action Role Playing Society =

The New Zealand Live Action Role Playing Society, Inc. (NZLARPS) is a not for profit organization that supports Live action role-playing games in New Zealand. Formed by a collection of larpers in Auckland in 2006, NZLARPS has grown to encompass around 150 members, with chapters in Auckland, Wellington, Hamilton, Christchurch and Dunedin. NZLARPS mainly serves as an umbrella organization within the New Zealand LARP community, aiding its members in the designing and running of events and providing funding and equipment.

NZLARPS currently supports campaigns in Auckland and Wellington as well as four dedicated larp conventions: Chimera (Auckland), Cerberus (Dunedin), Hydra (Wellington), Phoenix (Christchurch) and Medusa (Hamilton).
