= Profound Decisions =

Live-action role-playing game company

Profound Decisions is a company running live action role-playing games in the United Kingdom.

Since 2012, Profound's principal game has been Empire, considered to be the largest UK LARP with recent events attended by over 4,500 players.

The company was founded in 2004 to run Maelstrom, a fantasy game with colonial themes which attracted around 900 players. Between 2010 and 2016, Profound Decisions also ran Odyssey, a game set in the classical period.
