= Bicolline =

Live-action role-playing venue and event

Le Duché de Bicolline
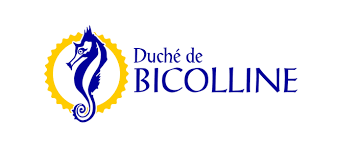
- Bicolline logo
- Founded: 1994
- Location: Saint-Mathieu-du-Parc
- Coordinates: 46.577°N 72.902°W
- Services: Largest event is seven-day fest with around 5600 participants
- Methods: Proprietary (foam weapons)
- Field: Fantasy
- Owner: Olivier Renard
- Website: bicolline.org/en/

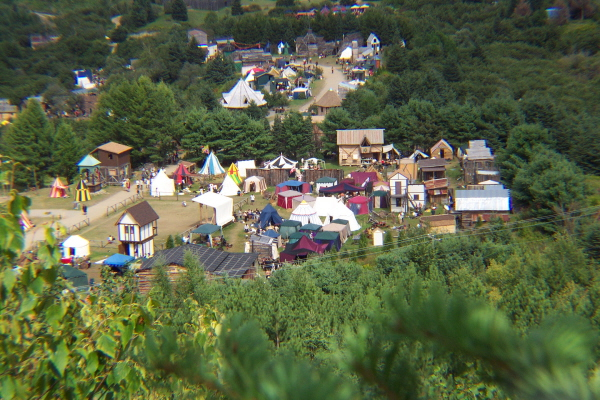
A part of the Duchy of Bicolline

Bicolline (French: [bikɔlin]) is a Quebec-based fantasy live combat experience founded in 1994. It was not until 1996 however, that Le Duché de Bicolline and the first official "Grande Bataille" took place and was formed. It is often labeled as a live action role-playing game (LARP) due to the large percentage of players who participate in role-playing. Events take place at a dedicated venue covering 140 hectares and two medieval villages. Le Duché de Bicolline is located in Saint-Mathieu-du-Parc near Shawinigan, QC.

== Venue ==
Participents have built two medieval villages with roads, bridges, ditches, houses and inns at the Duché de Bicolline venue. Construction days are scheduled throughout spring and summer for those building new houses. These houses are built to resemble medieval buildings and to be as decorum as possible. Players are responsible for their own buildings and must follow standards of construction. With two villages that are composed of over 220 buildings, and more being added each year, Bicolline is one of the largest immersion medieval venues in the world.

== Setting ==
The world of Mundus has its own geography, economy, conflicts, and complex geopolitics that have been evolving since its inception in response to the actions of the players and the outcomes of battles and events. The geopolitical system is based on feudal Europe, and is the basis for most of the actions undertaken on the ground during the events.

The complexity of the setting is such that it is almost impossible for an individual to control more than one area of competition such as commercial, political, military, or religious. Generally, guilds specialize and focus on one or two aspects of the game. The guilds have diverse experts among their members, each able to follow the changes and fully understand one aspect of the world of Bicolline.

The political arena consists of fiefdoms and provinces that form the kingdom. All levels of politics can be filled by players, making the world very dynamic. Accession to titles of nobility follows a democratic system. This modern aspect helps to make the experience accessible to all. It is possible to create internal conflicts and external playing with virtual units. These virtual wars can be realized in a fight during real scenarios on the ground.

The commercial aspect of the game is constantly changing, following an in-game market. Goods are transacted at extremely variable prices depending on their availability and the stability of the kingdom. All the goods in the Bicolline world are in the form of cards. These cards have a certain worth depending on the day's market and are often traded among players in order to fortify their guild or to complete certain tasks. There is also the population cards that each member of Bicolline receives upon entry. These are seen as one of the most precious cards in the game available for a commoner, as each guild must accumulate a certain number of cards in order to stay in existence. Military units for the geopolitical war game are represented by cards too, some can be worth up to ten population cards. Many players try to exchange and gather as many population cards as they can in order to help their guild, and are also some of the most expensive cards on the market. Bicolline also mints its own coins, called the Solar, that are another currency of transaction.

=== Guilds ===
The basic unit of organisation both in-game and out-of-game is the guild. Guilds are voluntary groupings of players promoting an event, a race or a common goal. Typically a guild has about thirty members. There are sometimes clans without guilds and fewer members which will usually eventually form a registered guild. Each guild or clan has a chief that guides the rest of their members of the on-goings in the Bicolline world. The guild structure allows efficient distribution of information and gives players a weight in the game beyond what they can achieve as individual characters. There are currently 181 recorded guilds and clans.

The majority of the guild can be divided into broad categories: military, commercial, political, religious, criminal, and magical. Each is affiliated with one or more kingdoms in the world of Bicolline: Kalthera, Empire, Andorra, Arganne, Ozame, Nasgaroth, Garganesh, Irendill, Taluskan, Sands-City, the South Lands, Berkwald, and the Independent Cities wherein each has a King. Each guild also follows a religion, each with its own God to whom they pray to and can have a major influence on their game.

A guild also possess an emblem and distinctive colors. This helps identify players during a battle. Some guilds are more strict regarding wearing the group attire. Not wearing the guild colors might create confusion on the battlefield and get your character killed as it is safer for your side to kill you instead of taking the chance that you might actually be an enemy. Therefore, wearing the guild color can have positive or negative impact on your playing depending on the strategy employed. Guild size can range from less than ten players to a few hundred.

=== Economy ===
The economic system is played by acquiring resources which are represented with cards. Usually resources are owned by and traded between guilds. These resources are then turned in to the game system to build, upkeep, or upgrade virtual game resources. One card can represent either a single resource (one sheep) or a lot of resources (20 sheep). The game system prints and releases these cards in batches as rewards for quests, campaigns, tavern nights, special events, adventures, and the Grand Battle. Individual players may also be awarded economic cards for fair play witnessed by marshals during combat. Guilds and individual players within the game have created and run markets which buy and sell resource cards, similar to medieval market towns, most of which can be found in Old Town. Most players do not participate in the game's economic level of play, as effective use of the cards requires land in the virtual game.

== System ==
Unlike some LARPs, Bicolline does not have a character creation system. However, every participant must dress in accordance to the period. Many players create elaborate characters with costumes, accessories and even face paint. The players can portray any kind of character that they are able to dress as; for example, one guild dresses Japanese while, another dresses as blue people, as some guilds consist of all the members portraying a certain character. A select few characters can apprentice under one of the rare master alchemists and sorcerers to give their guild bonuses between events; usually these are only possible after attending several events. Much of the roleplaying in the game of Bicolline happens in the "virtual world" between events, where armies move, economies produce income, and sorcerers cast spells. The "virtual world" is seen as the most important aspect of the entire game and world of Bicolline. It is in the "virtual world" that most of the action and decisions take place. Not every person who attends Bicolline participates in the virtual game, but those who are actively involved contribute to the "virtual world" and the actions and decisions made influence their game as well as the game of others.

=== Combat rules ===
The simplified rules of combat are handed to each participant, as a card, during registration. English and French versions are available. This simplified rules set was published in 2017 by Duche du Bicolline.

==== Fair play ====
- The marshals wearing blue and yellow tabards have authority on the battlefield. They are the ones to contact in case of an accident.
- All participants, weapons, shields, monsters, war machines, and in-game items or objects must be homologated before entering the battlefield.
- Each individual is responsible for counting the hits they themselves receive and not the ones they give.
- It is forbidden to voluntarily betray the side you swore allegiance to.

==== Hit areas ====
- The body is divided into six (6) hit areas that have 1 hit point (HP) each: each arm, each leg, the trunk and the head (includes the neck).
- The eyes, nose, mouth and genitals cannot be targeted.

==== Weapons and combat ====
- All hits deal 1 damage point (DP) and must be delivered using a weapon. It is the hit itself that counts and not the force with which it is dealt.
- All weapons of 112 cm or more must be held with two hands and spears must have a mark 50 cm from the pommel, delimiting a zone where you are limited to the presence of a single hand.
- It is forbidden to thrust or aim projectiles at an opponent's head, to use excessive force or to hit someone with a shield.

==== Death and injuries ====
- A hit area becomes useless and inoperable when it is reduced to 0 HPs. If the head or the trunk are reduced to 0 HPs, the participant automatically dies and must act as such.
- It is forbidden to fake death.

==== Armor ====
- You are allowed to carry one indestructible shield.
- Pieces of armor protect the wearer by adding non-cumulative armor points (AP) and only the specific area that is covered by the armor is protected. A hit area can never lose more APs than the value of its highest type of protection.
  - +2 AP: Armor made of overlapping metal plates.
  - +1 AP: Armor made of flexible or rigid armor.
  - +0 AP: All other accessories or clothing.

==== Monsters and war machines ====
- Monsters have 10 HPs distributed over their body and are immune to projectiles.
- War machines can be destroyed by removing their red flag.
- A monster's weapon and moving projectiles from war machines kill instantaneously (one-shot kill). This included hits delivered to all six hit areas, the shield or any piece of clothing or equipment.

All physical contact and violent or disregardful behavior are strictly forbidden.

== Activities ==
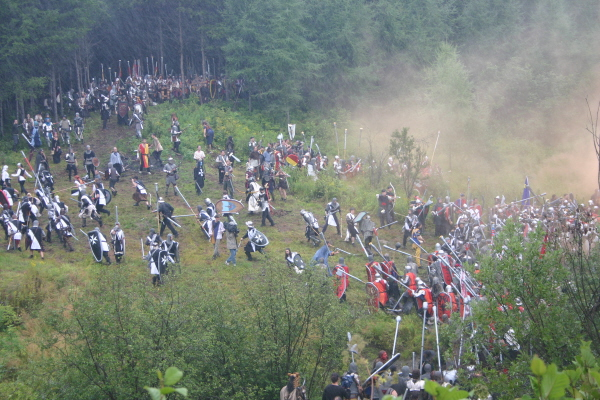
Players taking part in the Great Battle of Bicolline in 2005

As many as 4,250 people attend the main event The Great Battle of Bicolline. Participants travel from Canada, the United States, Europe and Australia to participate. Dozens of volunteers and a core group of employees work all year to create one of the world's largest and most decorum-rich LARP settings. In addition to the Great Battle, various events are held throughout the year including the Bal Pourpre (approximately 1000 people in March), tavern evenings (300–500 peoples about 7–8 times per year) and campaigns and battle scenarios of all kinds that usually attract several hundred people.

=== The Great Battle of Bicolline ===
Every year since 1996, a large LARP has been organized at the venue. The Great Battle of Bicolline brings together thousands of LARPers and medieval reenactors over seven days, and culminates in a huge battle. The battle is prepared for throughout the year with skirmishes and diplomacy between the various groups that attend. Everyone in attendance must dress up medieval at all times, and all modern items, such as cellphones are put away and unused. All participants submerge themselves into the world of Bicolline, getting into their roles and characters and the real world is left behind. Every detail, all the way down to the utensils used must be decorum in order to create the medieval atmosphere. The large grounds are filled with many houses as well as medieval tents. There are also some designated areas where those with regular camping tents may be placed in order to minimize the viewing of modern items. Throughout the week there are several events and activities; each night there is a musical spectacle as well as a show, there are competitions and small battles which lead up to the Great Battle, as well as activities and small battles for the children. The Great Battle takes place on the last day of the week (Saturday) and normally endures between 3 and 4 hours long. Each year there is a new scenario based on the events and occurrences throughout the year in the "virtual world." There are specific rules in place in order to assure safety. The age limit in order to participate in the Battle is sixteen. Upon entry into the ground, each person is given a colored bracelet according to age. Those who are under sixteen upon registration must wear a child bracelet. Those who are sixteen and older wear a different colored bracelet, ensuring that those who aren't of age aren't mistaken for those that are. Weapons are also checked by the workers of Bicolline and are marked in order to ensure the safety of players and ensure that no unsafe weapon is used during the battle. Weapons such as swords and daggers are normally made out of foam and arrows are tipped with large amounts of foam and tape in order to avoid serious injury. There are even vendors that make and sell weapons that have already been checked and approved by Bicolline. Most participants also wear armors in leather or metal which allow for protection throughout the battle. With armor worn, a point system applies and it then takes a certain number of "touches" by a weapon in order to be considered injured or dead, depending on placement of armor and where the weapon has touched the body.

=== Bal Pourpre ===
The "Bal Pourpre" is the second most popular event in the Bicolline world. With many of the members of Bicolline attending the event, it is a night to reunite with allies and guild members to discuss upcoming events, as well as plans of next moves. With a masquerade theme, everyone in attendance must wear a mask and are encouraged to dress their best, but still medieval in design and style.

=== Trollball ===
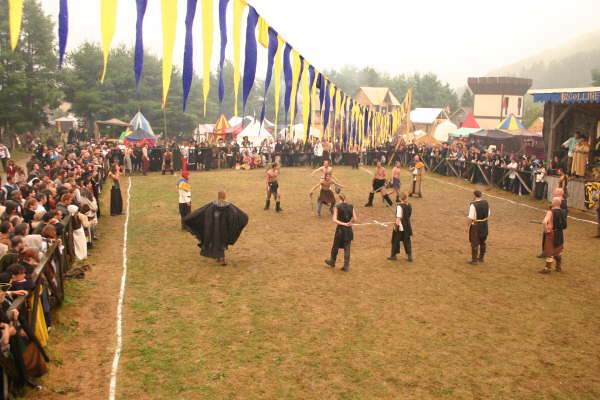
A game of Trollball

Trollball is a sport played in Bicolline and other LARP settings. It is played in Europe and Canada, with many teams competing. One account states Trollball was started by Jose Antonio Ouellette in 1995, although a similar game by the same name was played as a tournament at The Gathering LARP event in the UK in 1991.

The goal of the game is to put the troll head in a well without being hit by the foam weapons of the opposing team's attackers. Each player has a clearly defined position within their team such as Troller, Healer, Attacker or Reserve. Strategy, group cohesiveness and solid fighting skills are major assets in this sport.

This is the official sport of Bicolline and there is a large tournament each year at the "Grande Bataille". Almost every guild has at least one team that competes in the tournament throughout the week until there is a winner.

=== Tournaments ===
A variety of tournaments are held during the week of Bicolline. These range from chess (with an expensive entry fee) to gladiators (where pairs of armorless fighters face off), strongman (speed and strength), and archery (including a one-on-one combat). Each participant and winner of these tournaments receive a prize. Whether these be cards or solars, many guild leaders encourage their members to participate in the tournaments as a way to contribute to the guild and help build their kingdom.

=== Adventures ===
Bicolline has begun to run events which are focused more closely on the story of a location in the game world. The scope of the Adventures tends to be focused on interpersonal narrative, rather than guild interaction. Each year the administration runs one plot line three times in different months. La Confrérie de l'Hippocampe was held in 2018. These events are run in a style similar to other larps in the region. Players meet with the Event Holder, to be given basic plot, honorary titles, or possibly additional coins, before venturing forth into the game world. The game is live for approximately 2 days, and New Auberge acts as an Inn or tavern familiar to players of table top RPGs.

=== Quests ===
Many guilds organize weeklong quests for other players. There is usually some reward for being the first to complete the quest. These quests require extensive travel and searching, but do allow for interactions between other players and can even help in making new alliances. The information and rewards gathered throughout the quests are just another way to help the players guilds and to fortify their stocks and supplies, which in return affects some outcomes in the "virtual world" as well as the "Grande Bataille".
