= Lorien Trust =

Company that runs live roleplaying games

Lorien Trust/Merlinroute ltd.
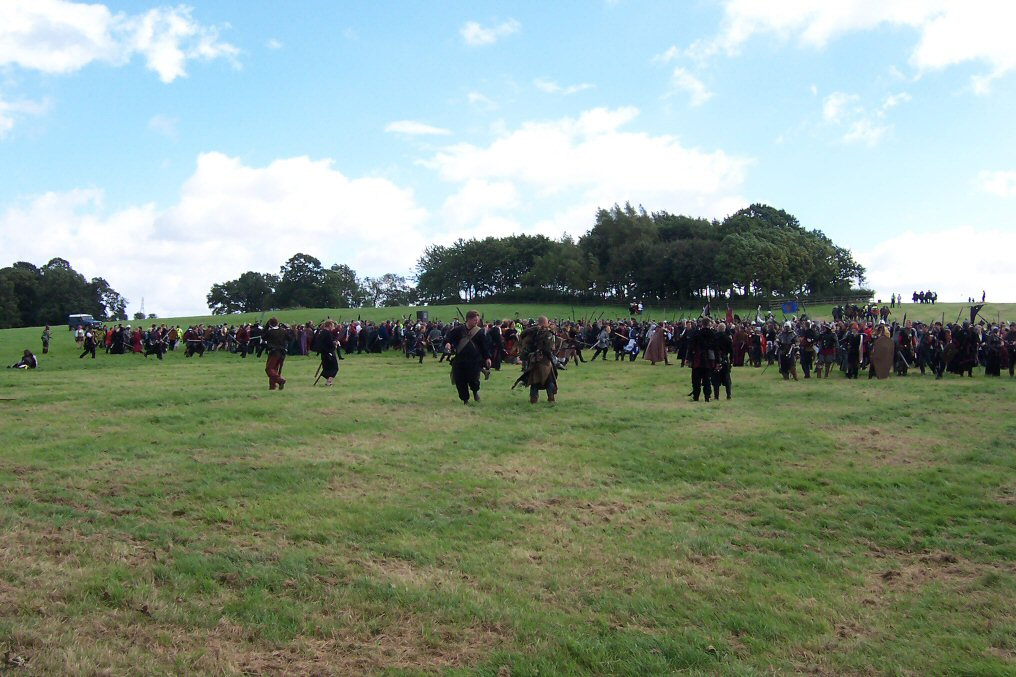
- A battle at The Gathering
- Abbreviation: The LT
- Founded: 1992
- Type: National business
- Location: Locko Park, Spondon, Derby, UK
- Services: Weekend fest events, historically with up to 3000 participants
- Methods: Proprietary (foam weapons)
- Field: High Fantasy
- Website: www.lorientrust.com

Lorien Trust (sometimes abbreviated to LT) is the trading name of Merlinroute ltd., a Live Action Role-Play organisation that runs LARP events at Locko Park, Derby, UK. It runs some of Britain's largest Live Roleplay events, historically claiming to attract around 1,200 to 1,500 to its first three events each year and around 2,500 to 3,000 people to The Gathering. More recent figures are lower, but not in the public domain. It was formed in 1992, originally as a charitable organisation (hence "Trust" in the name). In 1995 it became Merlinroute ltd trading as Lorien Trust. The Lorien Trust has a well established game world, and uses its own set of LARP rules, known simply as the "Lorien Trust rules system". In addition to the four events held per year, the Lorien Trust also sanctions many smaller events to use the same system and game world.

The Lorien Trust's flagship event is The Gathering. It is held over the August bank holiday weekend. The final battle of The Gathering once drew around 1200 players on each side, but recent figures are not in the public domain. These were some of the largest live action battles in Europe.

The setting for these events is the fictional world of Erdreja which is described as "high fantasy/medieval".

== Events ==
- Spring Moot - Held on the Early May Bank holiday.
- The Great Erdrejan Fayre (GEF) - A sports championship themed event, previously known as the Heartland Games - Held on the Spring Bank Holiday (usually at the end of May).
- Summer Moot - Usually held around the first or second weekend of the Summer Holidays (late July / early August).
- The Gathering - Lorien Trust's flagship event held on the Summer Bank Holiday (end of August).

== Erdreja ==
Erdreja is a relatively free-form fantasy world which imports its concepts from numerous sources including Dungeons & Dragons and fantasy novels. The LT's campaign focuses around a continental region of Erdreja, known as the Heartlands. This region is divided into ten separate kingdoms, each governed by one of the Factions of Erdreja. Each Faction takes its name from an animal associated with that kingdom. Every player character belongs to one of the ten Factions. Characters may also be members of none/any/all of the Guilds.

The ten factions and their main inspirations are:

- The Bears (primarily Scottish clansmen)
- The Dragons (based on Celts from Ireland and Wales)
- The Gryphons (Based on the Romans, Medieval France, and Medieval Spain)
- The Harts (English in the tradition of King Arthur)
- The Jackals (Arabic and Ancient Greek people)
- The Lions (also English, sharing the Harts' background with Viking Roots)
- The Tarantulas (mainly Drow from the Underdark)
- The Unicorns (seafaring traders with a chain of tropical islands)
- The Vipers (Teutonic people including many Goblins and Orcs)
- The Wolves (based on Viking cultures)

The fifteen guilds are:

- The Healers
- The Incantors
- The Bards
- The Alchemists
- The Militia
- The Bank
- The Rangers (previously the Archers)
- The Scouts
- The Mages
- The Armourers
- The Watchers
- The Great Library
- The Casino
- The Corruptors
- The Adventurers (also referred to as the children's guild, and colloquially as "kid's plot")

Within the Factions, players organise themselves into semi-independent groups (e.g. The Chaos Guild). Each group usually has some kind of common purpose (a military unit, for example, or a trading company), and many players will put great effort into giving their group a strong identity.

In addition to the Factions, there are also a number of international Guilds, whose In Character role is to provide training and support for members of different professions. Out of Character, the Guilds also help to administer the LT system - the Armourers Guild, for example, handles the creation of player-crafted weapons and armour.

In the early years of the LT, Erdreja was conceived as an open gameworld: players were allowed to play any kind of character they wished. Over time, the problems of maintaining continuity in such a free-flowing system, coupled with the growing prevalence of LARPs with closed gameworlds, led the LT to exert some control over the types of character permitted in the system. That said, there is still a wide variety of races and character roles available to players. The races, like much of the rest of the gameworld, are drawn from fantasy literature:

- Humans
- Beastkin (Beastmen, etc.)
- Elves
- Urucks (Goblins, Orcs, etc.)
- Ologs (Ogres, Trolls, etc.)
- Dwarves
- Fey - Wild Fey, Seelie, Unseelie
- Wee folk (Halflings, etc.)
- Other (Which encompasses anything else a player can make an acceptable costume for, including; Golems, Genies or Garthim. Though only in very special cases are the related attributes of these races applied to the character. Along with the races there are many skills that can be chosen from to personalise a character, such as healing or spell casting.

Erdreja is saturated with magic of various kinds, and spell-casting characters are common. In-character rituals are often carried out by players to create magical items or to further an ongoing plot. In character faith is universally based around ancestor worship.

== Media coverage ==
In June 2011, it was found that, among staff at the UK's Department of Transport using work computers, the Lorien Trust gameworld (more specifically the bears faction forums) was the 385th most visited website. In October 2012, the Huffington Post published an in-depth report exploring a first-time roleplayer's view of the Live Roleplay scene from the point of view of someone attending the Gathering for the first time and interviewing a number of attendees, charting The Lorien Trust and other systems in the UK.
