= Live action role-playing game =

Game with physically enacted role-play

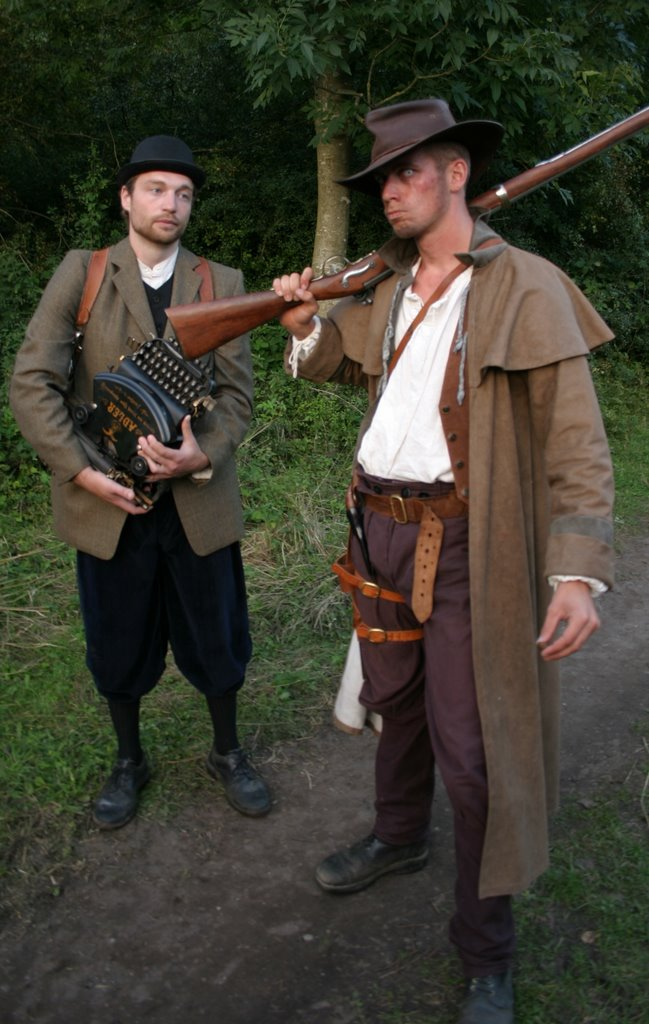
Players dressed in character for a LARP event

Live action role-playing (LARP) is a form of role-playing game where the participants physically portray their selected characters. The players pursue goals within a fictional setting represented by real-world environments while interacting with each other in character. The outcome of player actions may be mediated by game rules or determined by consensus among players. Event arrangers called gamemasters decide the setting, specify the rules to be used, and facilitate play.

The first LARPs took place in the late 1970s, inspired by tabletop role-playing games and genre fiction. The activity spread internationally during the 1980s and has diversified into a wide variety of styles. Play may be very game-like or may be more concerned with dramatic or artistic expression. Gamemasters may design events to achieve educational or political goals. The fictional genres used vary greatly, from realistic modern or historical settings to fantastic or futuristic eras. Production-values, though sometimes minimal, can involve elaborate venues and costumes. LARPs range in size from small private events lasting a few hours, to large public events with thousands of players lasting for days.

== Terminology ==
LARP has also been referred to as live role-playing (LRP), interactive literature, and free form role-playing. Some of these terms are still in common use; however, LARP has become the most commonly accepted term. It is sometimes written in lowercase, as larp.

== Play overview ==
The participants in a LARP physically portray characters in a fictional setting, improvising their characters' speech and movements somewhat like actors in improvisational theatre. This is distinct from tabletop role-playing games, where character actions are described verbally. LARPs may be played in a public or private area and may last for hours or days. There is usually no audience. Players may dress as their character and carry appropriate equipment, and the environment is sometimes decorated to resemble the setting. LARPs can be one-off events or a series of events in the same setting, and events can vary in size from a handful of players to several thousand.

Arrangers called gamemasters (GMs) determine the rules and setting of a LARP, and may also influence an event and act as referees while it is taking place. The GMs may also do the logistical work, or there may be other arrangers who handle details such as advertising the event, booking a venue, and financial management. Unlike the GM in a tabletop role-playing game, a LARP GM seldom has an overview of everything that is happening during play because numerous participants may be interacting at once. For this reason, a LARP GM's role is often less concerned with tightly maintaining a narrative or directly entertaining the players, and more with arranging the structure of the LARP before play begins and facilitating the players and crew to maintain the fictional environment during play.

Participants sometimes known as the crew may help the GMs to set up and maintain the environment of the LARP during play by acting as stagehands or playing non-player characters (NPCs) who fill out the setting. Crew typically receive more information about the setting and more direction from the GMs than players do. In a tabletop role-playing game, a GM usually plays all the NPCs, whereas in a LARP, each NPC is typically played by a separate crew member.

Much of play consists of interactions between characters. Some LARP scenarios primarily feature interaction between PCs. Other scenarios focus on interaction between PCs and aspects of the setting, including NPCs, that are under the direction of the GMs.

== History ==
LARP does not have a single point of origin, but was invented independently by groups in North America, Europe, and Australia. These groups shared an experience with genre fiction or tabletop role-playing games, and a desire to physically experience such settings. In addition to tabletop role-playing, LARP is rooted in childhood games of make believe, play fighting, costume parties, roleplay simulations, Commedia dell'arte, improvisational theatre, psychodrama, military simulations, and historical reenactment groups such as the Society for Creative Anachronism.

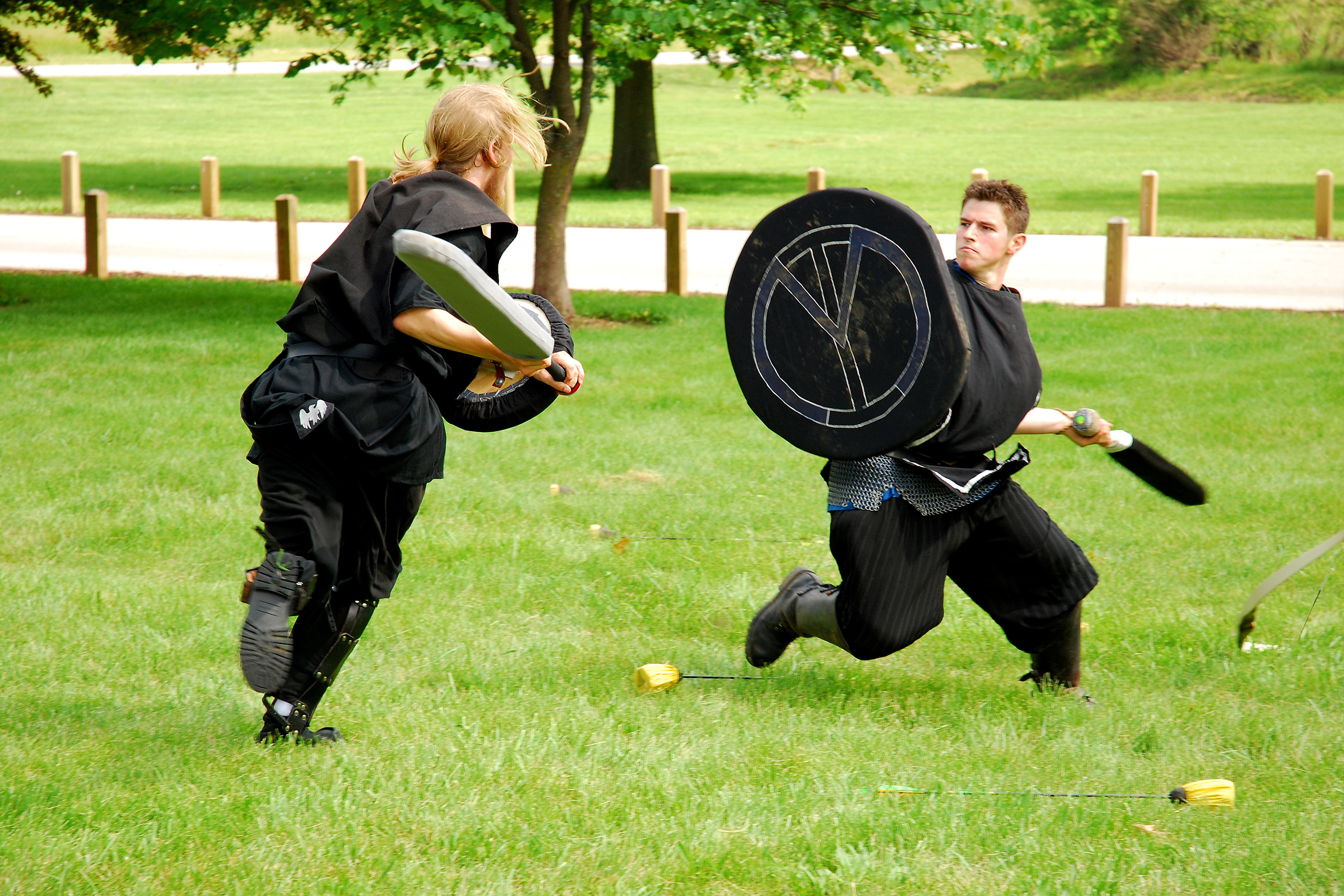
Two Dagorhir fighters use foam weapons to duel.

The earliest recorded LARP group is Dagorhir, which was founded in 1977 in the United States and focuses on fantasy battles. Soon after the release of the movie Logan's Run in 1976, rudimentary live role-playing games based on the movie were run at US science fiction conventions. In 1981, the International Fantasy Gaming Society (IFGS) started, with rules influenced by Dungeons & Dragons. IFGS was named after a fictional group in the 1981 novel Dream Park, which described futuristic LARPs. In 1982, the Society for Interactive Literature formed as the first recorded theatre-style LARP group in the US.

Treasure Trap, formed in 1982 at Peckforton Castle, was the first recorded LARP game in the UK and influenced the fantasy LARPs that followed there. The first recorded LARP in Australia was run in 1983, using the science fiction Traveller setting. In 1993, White Wolf Publishing released Mind's Eye Theatre, which is played internationally and is the most commercially successful published LARP. The first German events were in the early 1990s, with fantasy LARP in particular growing quickly there, so that since 2001, two major German events have been run annually that have between 3000 and 7000 players each and attract players from around Europe.

Today, LARP is a widespread activity internationally. Games with thousands of participants are run by for-profit companies, and a small industry exists to sell costume, armour and foam weapons intended primarily for LARP. In 2023, Dicebreaker reported that "China has developed its own LARP phenomenon in recent years. Jubensha is far more commercially successful and influential than anything we have seen before even in Nordic countries – and there is a good chance it might change our perception of what live-action roleplaying games are capable of in the future".

== Purpose ==
Most LARPs are intended as games for entertainment. Enjoyable aspects can include the collaborative creation of a story, the attempt to overcome challenges in pursuit of a character's objectives, and a sense of immersion in a fictional setting. LARPs may also include other game-like aspects such as intellectual puzzles, and sport-like aspects such as fighting with simulated weapons.

Some LARPs stress artistic considerations such as dramatic interaction or challenging subject matter. Avant-garde or arthaus events have especially experimental approaches and high culture aspirations and are occasionally held in fine art contexts such as festivals or art museums. The themes of avant-garde events often include politics, culture, religion, sexuality and the human condition. Such LARPs are common in the Nordic countries but also present elsewhere.

In addition to entertainment and artistic merit, LARP events may be designed for educational or political purposes. For example, the Danish secondary school Østerskov Efterskole uses LARP to teach most of its classes. Language classes can be taught by immersing students in a role-playing scenario in which they are forced to improvise speech or writing in the language they are learning. Politically-themed LARP events may attempt to awaken or shape political thinking within a culture.

Because LARP involves a controlled artificial environment within which people interact, it has sometimes been used as a research tool to test theories in social fields such as economics or law. For example, LARP has been used to study the application of game theory to the development of criminal law.

== Fiction and reality ==
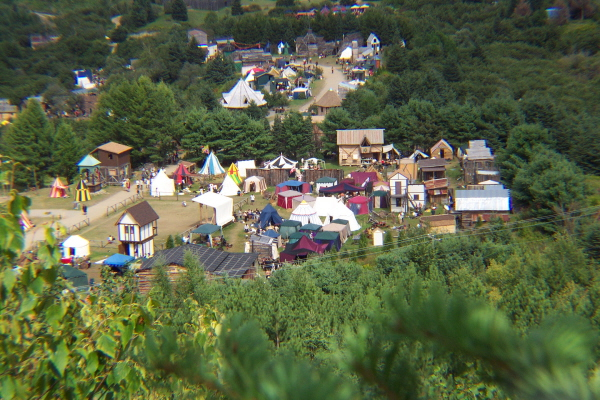
A medieval LARP venue, the Duchy of Bicolline

During a LARP, player actions in the real world represent character actions in an imaginary setting. Game rules, physical symbols and theatrical improvisation are used to bridge differences between the real world and the setting. For example, a rope could signify an imaginary wall. Realistic-looking weapon props and risky physical activity are sometimes discouraged or forbidden for safety reasons. While the fictional timeline in a tabletop RPG often progresses in game-time, which may be much faster or slower than the time passing for players, LARPs are different in that they usually run in real-time, with game-time only being used in special circumstances.

There is a distinction between when a player is in character, meaning they are actively representing their character, and when the player is out-of-character, meaning they are being themselves. Some LARPs encourage players to stay consistently in character except in emergencies, while others accept players being out-of-character at times. In a LARP, it is usually assumed that players are speaking and acting in character unless otherwise noted, which is the opposite of normal practice in tabletop role-playing games.

While most LARPs maintain a clear distinction between the real world and the fictional setting, pervasive LARPs mingle fiction with modern reality in a fashion similar to alternate reality games. Bystanders who are unaware that a game is taking place may be treated as part of the fictional setting, and in-character materials may be incorporated into the real world.

== Rules ==
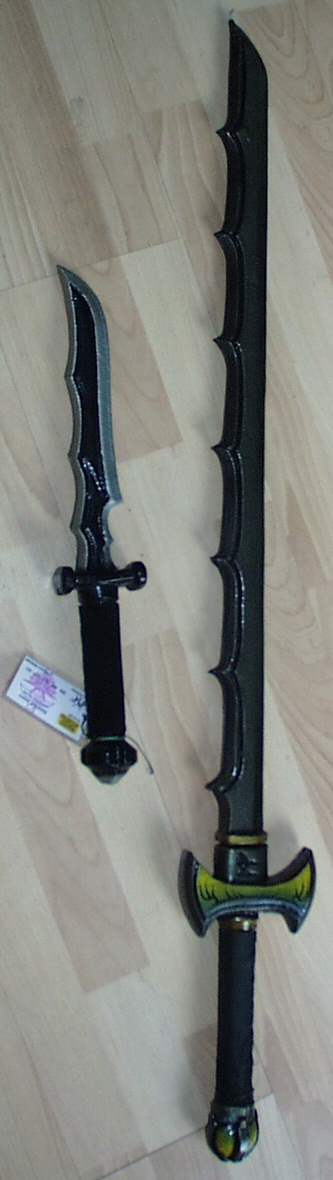
Foam weapons are sometimes used for combat.

Many LARPs have game rules that determine how characters can affect each other and the setting. The rules may be defined in a publication or created by the gamemasters. Some LARP rules call for the use of simulated weapons such as foam weapons or airsoft guns to determine whether characters succeed in hitting one another in combat situations. In Russian LARP events, weapons made of hard plastic, metal or wood are used. The alternative to using simulated weapons is to pause role-play and determine the outcome of an action symbolically, for example by rolling dice, playing rock paper scissors or comparing character attributes.

There are also LARPs that do without rules, instead relying on players to use their common sense or feel for dramatic appropriateness to cooperatively decide what the outcome of their actions will be.

== Genres ==
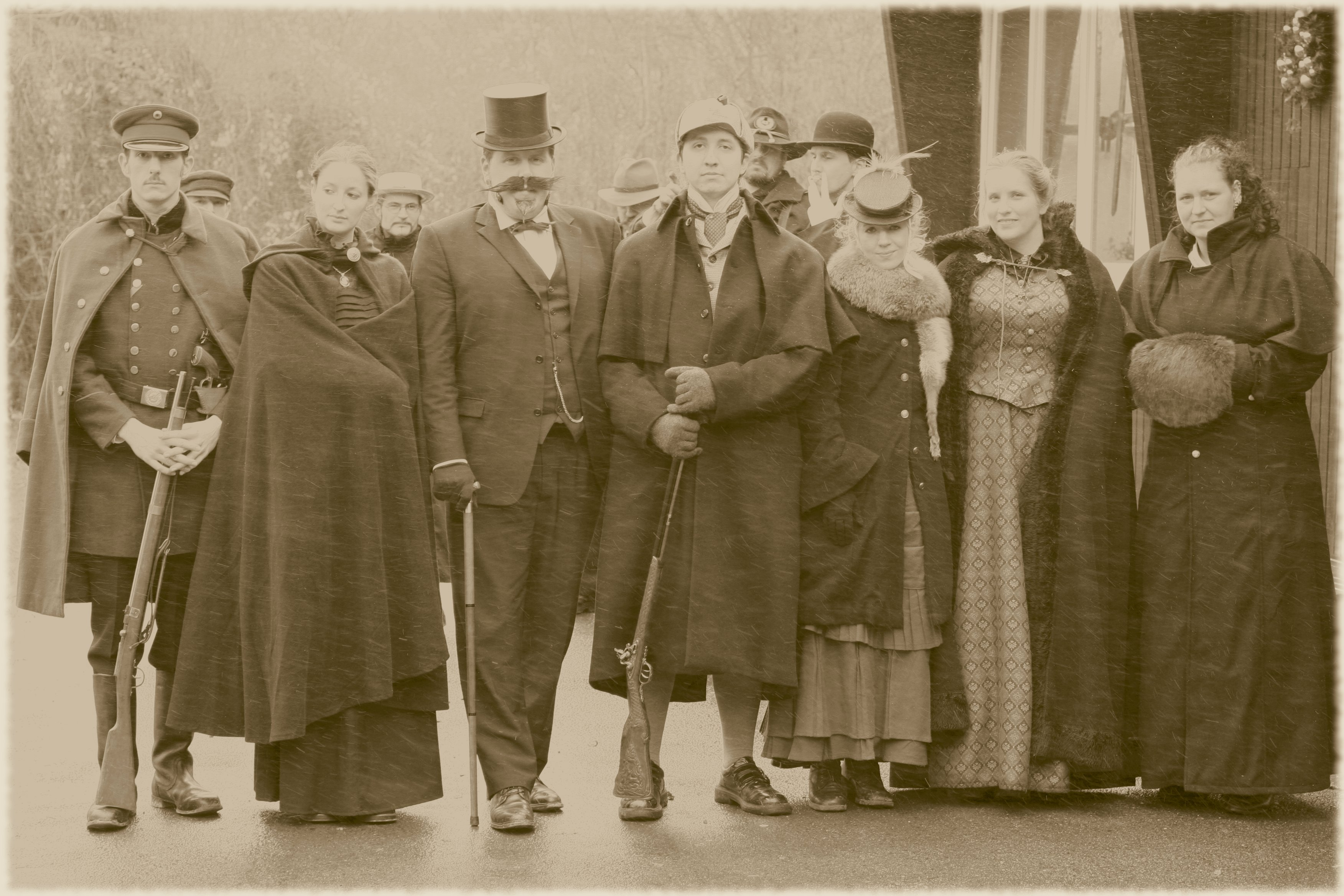
LARP with a Victorian setting

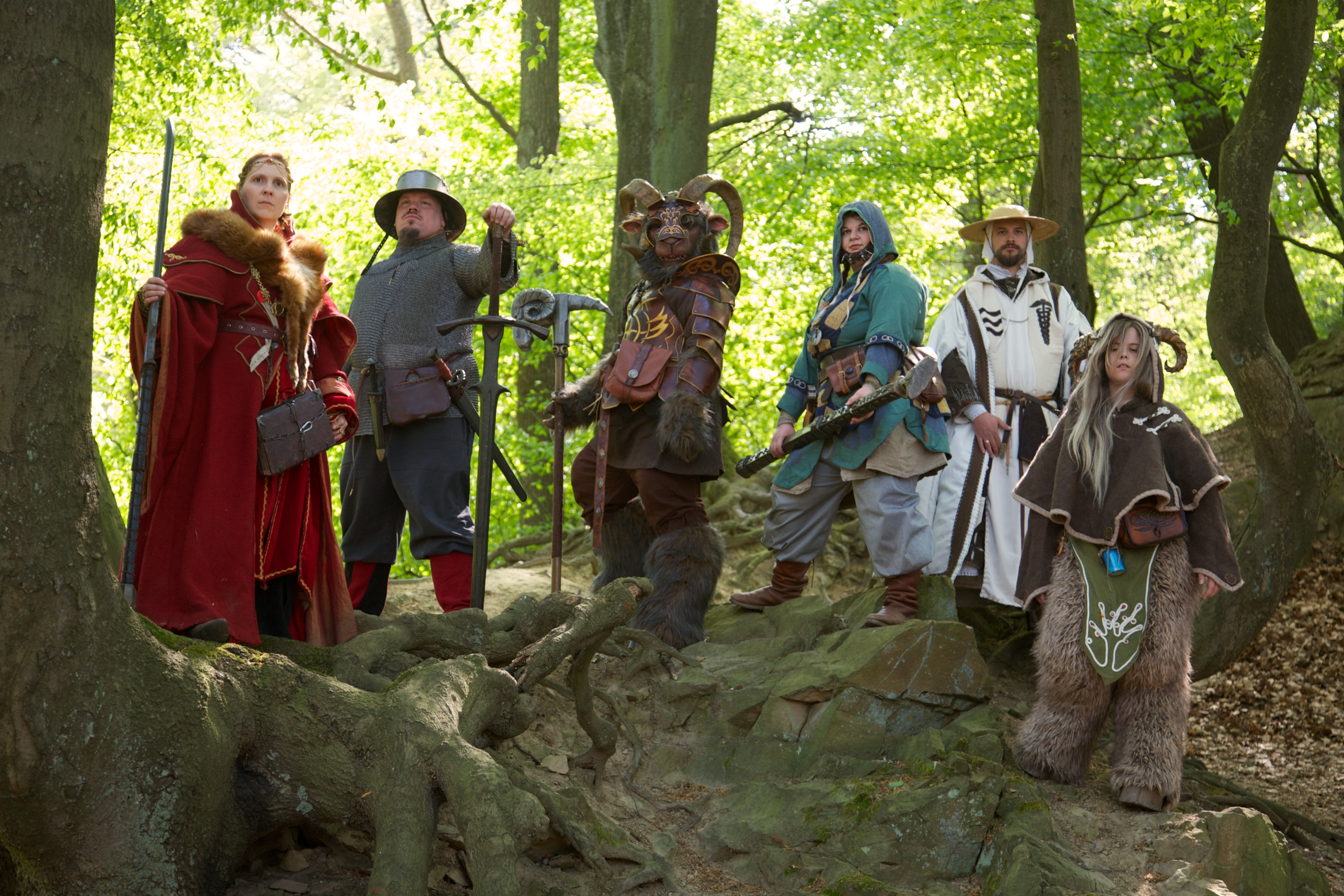
Fantasy LARP

LARPs can have any genre, although many use themes and settings derived from genre fiction. Some LARPs borrow a setting from an established work in another medium (e.g., The Lord of the Rings or World of Darkness), while others, such as mock trial competitions use settings based on the real world or designed specifically for the LARP.

Fantasy is one of the most common LARP genres internationally and is the genre that the largest events use. Fantasy LARPs are set in pseudo-historical worlds inspired by fantasy literature and fantasy role-playing games such as Dungeons & Dragons. These settings typically have magic, fantasy races, and limited technology. Many fantasy LARPs focus on adventure or on conflict between character factions. In contrast, science fiction LARPs take place in futuristic settings with high technology and sometimes with extraterrestrial life. This describes a broad array of LARPs, including politically themed LARPs depicting dystopian or utopian societies and settings inspired by cyberpunk, space opera and post-apocalyptic fiction.

Horror LARPs are inspired by horror fiction. Popular subgenres include zombie apocalypse and Cthulhu Mythos, sometimes using the published Cthulhu Live rules. The World of Darkness, published by White Wolf Publishing, is a widely used goth–punk horror setting in which players usually portray secretive supernatural creatures such as vampires and werewolves.

== Styles ==
LARP events have a wide variety of styles that often overlap. Simple distinctions can be made regarding the genre used, the presence of simulated weapons or abstract rules, and whether players create their own characters or have them assigned by gamemasters. There is also a distinction between scenarios that are only run once and those that are designed to be repeatable. While some LARPs are open to participants of all ages, others have a minimum age requirement. There are also youth LARPs, specifically intended for children and young people. Some are run through institutions such as schools, churches, or the Scouts. Denmark has an especially high number of youth LARPs.

=== Fests ===
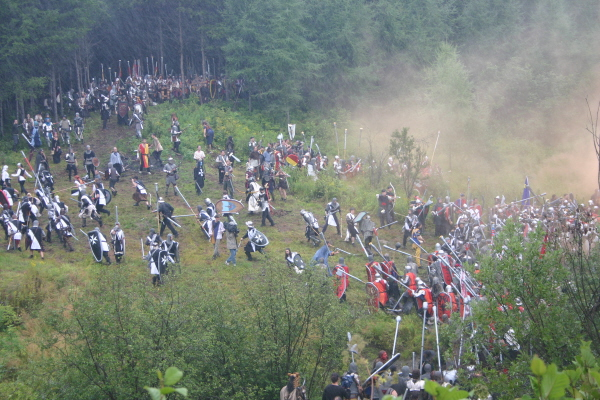
A battle with 2000 participants at Bicolline, Quebec (2005)

Some very large events known as fests (short for festival) have hundreds or thousands of participants who are usually split into competing character factions camped separately around a large venue. There are only a few fests in the world, all based in Europe and Canada; however, their size means that they have a significant influence on local LARP culture and design. At the other end of the size scale, some small events known as linear or line-course LARPs feature a small group of PCs facing a series of challenges from NPCs and are often more tightly planned and controlled by GMs than other styles of LARP.

=== Nordic LARP ===
Nordic larp emphasises a collaborative "play to lose" strategy, keeping rules unobtrusive, and often explores emotionally complex issues. The style emerged in Finland and Scandinavia during the 1990s with a focus on "collaborative storytelling around intense human experiences". Wired commented that this style adds "distinct challenges, including the possibility of real emotional harm. To work out issues of how to keep players safe and push the limits of the form, the community gathers at Knutepunkt, an annual meeting that is as much hardcore game jam as academic conference".

=== Script murder games ===
Script murder games, also known as jubensha (lit. 'scripted murder'), are murder mystery LARP games that emerged in China. Typically, script murder games can be experienced in a tabletop game format or a format which combines larping and escape rooms. Players are given different script options and are assigned characters to play through the murder mystery; these games often occur at dedicated gaming stores where players pay to participate. The style become popularized in 2015 "when reality shows with names like 'Lying Man,' 'Dinner Party Seduction,' and later 'Who's The Murderer,' showed celebrities playing whodunits" which led to the development of jubensha clubs that run games in this style.

== Cultural significance ==
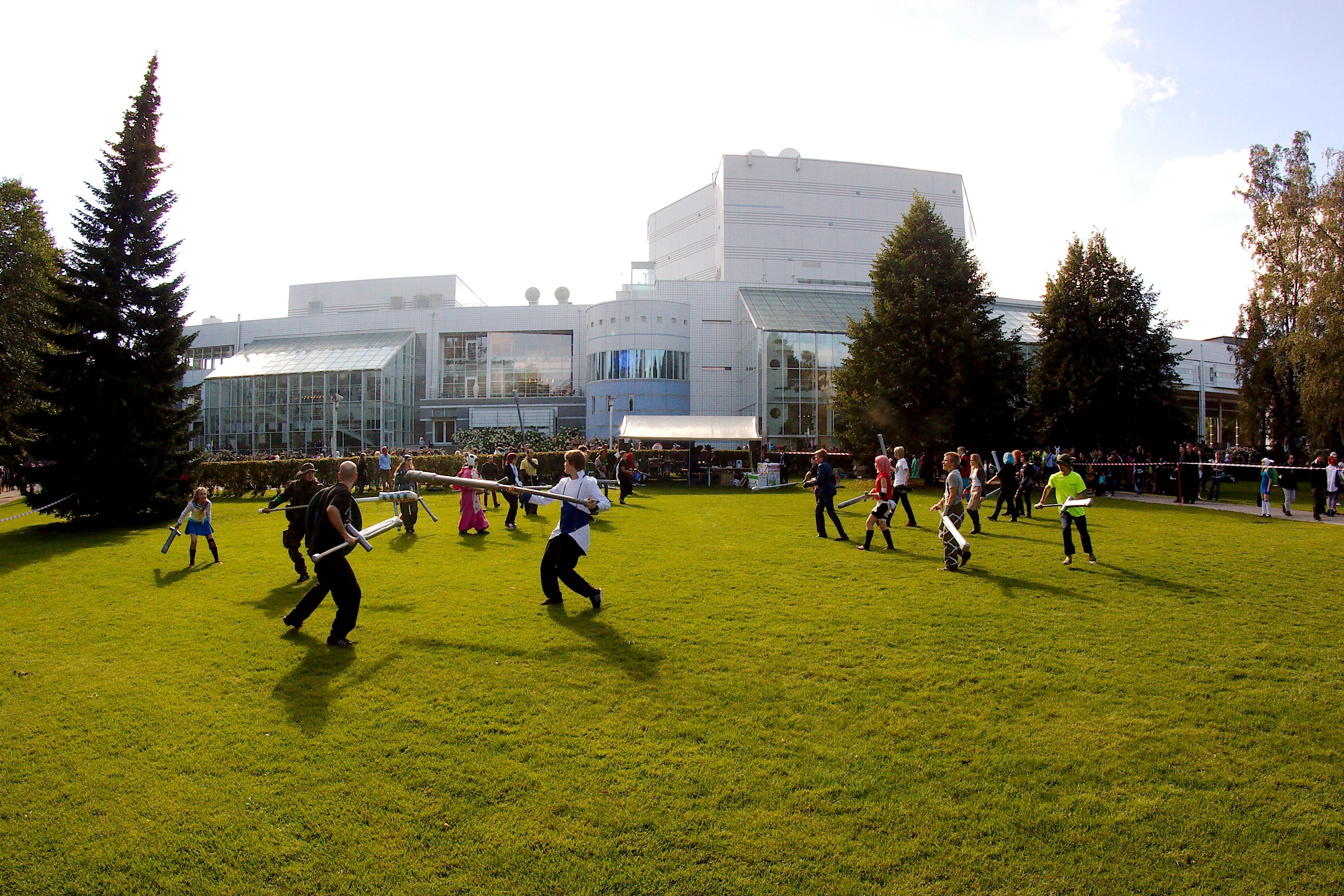
Open boffer tournament during the Tracon 9 event in Tampere, Finland

Roleplaying may be seen as part of a movement in Western culture towards participatory arts, as opposed to traditional spectator arts. Participants in a LARP cast off the role of passive observer and take on new roles that are often outside of their daily life and contrary to their culture. The arrangers of a LARP and the other participants act as co-creators of the game. This collaborative process of creating shared fictional worlds may be associated with a broader burgeoning "geek" culture in developed societies that is in turn associated with prolonged education, high uptake of information technology and increased leisure time. In comparison to the mainstream video-game industry, which is highly commercialized and often marketed towards a male audience, LARP is less commoditized, and women actively contribute as authors and participants.

LARP is not well known in most countries and is sometimes confused with other role-playing, reenactment, costuming, or dramatic activities. While fan and gamer culture in general has become increasingly mainstream in developed countries, LARP has often not achieved the same degree of cultural acceptability. This may be due to intolerance of the resemblance to childhood games of pretend, a perceived risk of over-identification with the characters, and the absence of mass marketing. In US films such as the 2006 documentary Darkon, the 2007 documentary Monster Camp, and the 2008 comedy Role Models, fantasy LARP is depicted as somewhat ridiculous and escapist, but also treated affectionately as a "constructive social outlet". In the Nordic countries, LARP has achieved a high level of public recognition and popularity. It is often shown in a positive light in mainstream media, with an emphasis on the dramatic and creative aspects. However, even in Norway, where LARP has greater recognition than in most other countries, it has still not achieved full recognition as a cultural activity by government bodies.

Communities have formed around the creation, play and discussion of LARP. These communities have developed a subculture that crosses over with role-playing, fan, reenactment, and drama subcultures. Early LARP subculture focused on Tolkien-like fantasy, but it later broadened to include appreciation of other genres, especially the horror genre with the rapid uptake of the World of Darkness setting in the 1990s. Like many subcultures, LARP groups often have a common context of shared experience, language, humour, and clothing that can be regarded by some as a lifestyle.

LARP has been a subject of academic research and theory. Much of this research originates from role-players, especially from the publications of the Nordic Knutepunkt role-playing conventions. The broader academic community has recently begun to study LARP as well, both to compare it to other media and other varieties of interactive gaming, and also to evaluate it in its own right. In 2010, William Bainbridge speculated that LARP may one day evolve into a major industry in the form of location-based games using ubiquitous computing.

In Denmark, Østerskov Efterskole uses LARP as an educational method of teaching subjects to high school boarding students through interactivity and simulation. LARP groups also use simulations of current and historical events and topics like refugees and the AIDS crisis to roleplay and explore these subjects.

=== China ===
In China, the script murder game industry (jubensha) has continued to grow since 2015. The New York Times reported that in 2021 "the number of scripted murder enterprises registered in China totaled about 6,500, a more than 60 percent increase from the prior year, according to state-run media". Agence France-Presse reported that "the live action murder mystery market appears to have captured the imagination of China's urban youth before the Covid-19 pandemic emerged". During the COVID-19 pandemic, "Murder Mystery Game" (MMG) apps allowed people to play jubensha digitally and were "available to millions of people across" China. Dicebreaker reported that following the easing of pandemic restrictions in China, "more than 45,000 [jubensha] shops" opened with "nearly 10 million active players. It is estimated that soon the Jubensha market will reach 23.89 billion Chinese Yuan". Voice of America commented that, per the Chinese market research firm iResearch, script murder games are "the third most popular form of entertainment for Chinese people, after watching movies and participating in sports".

The popularization of script murder games and industry growth in China has led to both national and governmental attention with the Chinese government considering formal regulation of the industry. In September 2020, the Agence France-Presse commented that "a report on China National Radio last month voiced fears that too many of the scripts relied on murders, violent plots and sexual content, but others see the games as a way to get young people off their smartphones and back interacting with each other in real life". In October 2021, the South China Morning Post reported that "advertisements for script-killing are prominent in China. [...] The fact that it is a new industry is precisely the problem in the eyes of the authorities. Since the Covid-19 case that brought 'script-killing' to national attention, the game has been getting mainstream traction, inviting official concerns and possible future regulations". In October 2022, Polygon commented that Chinese "regulators are beginning to take notice of the genre's mature content. A story published Wednesday indicates that municipal and provincial authorities have now begun regulating content and demanding that some retailers remove certain materials from sale. [...] As a result, some store owners are now curating their selection to fall in line with government regulation". China Daily, a publication owned by the Chinese Communist Party, reported in April 2023 that China's Ministry of Culture and Tourism was beginning to draft regulations for script murder games and "soliciting public opinions". The draft regulations state that "the contents of such games must not smear the traditional Chinese culture or contain inappropriate materials involving obscenity, gambling, drugs, and other elements that could go against moral standards". The regulations also include additional rules for minors such as not allowing "underage customers on school days" and that "children under the age of 14 must be accompanied by their parents or other guardians".

== See also ==
- Cosplay
- List of live action role-playing groups
