= Beyond Geek =

American television documentary series

- Genre: Documentary
- Created by: Joe Gillis
- Starring: Brittni Barger; Nate Lake; Sage Michael; Dan Reynoso
- Narrated by: Jim Eckes
- Composer: David Limutau
- Country of origin: United States
- Original language: English
- No. of seasons: 2
- No. of episodes: 14

Production
- Executive producers: Joe Gillis; Rachel Gillis
- Running time: 26 minutes
- Production company: Jowagi Productions

Original release
- Release: October 1, 2014 – present

Beyond Geek is an American documentary television series that airs on PBS and public television stations across America. Beyond Geek Season 1 featured the 24 Hours of LeMons, Dagorhir, Belegarth, Amtgard, 8 Bit Weapon, NES Homebrew, JP Aerospace, WW2 Re-enactors, and Real-life Superheroes. Season 2 features Kinetic Sculpture Racing, Lightsaber Combat, Hackathon, Pirate Re-enactors, Professional Wrestling, Telerobotics, and Star Trek Fan Films.

== History ==
Joe Gillis came up with the idea for Beyond Geek about 2008. He wanted to make a show about things that interested him, and he felt there was a void that needed to be filled when it came to shows about geeky things. It started as a project he was going to do while he was on hiatus in-between seasons on the TV shows he was working on. The problem was the hiatus never happened, so it became a project he worked on during any extra time he had – which wasn't a lot. Eventually, he decided it was time to bite the bullet, and he went all in with a Field of Dreams approach to television – if you make it, they will come. So he called in all his favors, talked his wife into using all their savings, and they set out to make the first season.

== Episodes ==
Season 1 ran from October 1, 2014 – November 5, 2014 with six episodes hosted by Nate Lake, Sage Michael, and Dan Reynoso. Season 2 will run May 1, 2017 – June 19, 2017 with eight episodes hosted by Brittni Barger, Nate Lake, and Dan Reynoso.

=== Season 1 ===
No. overall	No. in season	Title	Original release date	Code
1	1	"Junk Car Racing"	October 1, 2014	101
Nate joins the ultimate endurance race with 500-dollar cars where anyone can be a race car driver.
2	2	"Battle Games"	October 8, 2014	102
The Medieval era meets Middle Earth in full-contact combat that has Sage engaging in a battle that would make Tolkien proud.
3	3	"8-Bit of Fun"	October 15, 2014	103
Dan learns how to breathe new life into outdated computers and video game consoles.
4	4	"Floating to Space"	October 22, 2014	104
Nate reaches for the final frontier with a group who has spent the past 30 years trying to get to space in a balloon.
5	5	"WW2 Re-enactors"	October 29, 2014	105
History comes alive as Dan gets a glimpse of what it was like to serve in World War II by donning a uniform and going to battle for the Allies.
6	6	"Real Superheroes"	November 5, 2014	106
Sage joins a group of people who dress up as superheroes to fight crime and finds out there’s more to them than just the tights.

=== Season 2 ===
No. overall	No. in season	Title	Original release date	Code
7	1	"Kinetic Sculpture Racing Part 1"	May 1, 2017	201
Dan races against all odds in a human-powered art sculpture race over land, sand, and water.
8	2	"Kinetic Sculpture Racing Part 2"	May 8, 2017	202
With everything going wrong, will Dan and the Hot Roddenberrys even finish the race?
9	3	"The Force is Strong"	May 15, 2017	203
Brittni wields the ultimate sci-fi weapon in lightsaber combat.
10	4	"Hackathon"	May 22, 2017	204
Nate races against the clock on a team creating something out of thin air in a 44-hour hackathon… and tries to do it with no sleep.
11	5	"A Pirate’s Life for Me"	May 29, 2017	205
Nate travels through time into a world filled with black powder weapons, swords fights, and adventure.
12	6	"High Flying Smackdown!"	June 5, 2017	206
Brittni learns to settle the score on the mat as she enters the world of pro-wrestling.
13	7	"Telerobotics"	June 12, 2017	207
Dan discovers how robots can open up your world to endless possibilities.
14	8	"Beam Me Up"	June 19, 2017	208
Brittni beams aboard a Star Trek fan film to help them create their latest production.
