= Darkon Wargaming Club =

Gaming club

The Darkon Wargaming Club is a non-profit battle gaming and live-action role-playing (LARP) club in the United States based in the Baltimore/Washington/Virginia area.

== History ==
Founded in 1985 and built upon the rules of the now-defunct Emarthnguarth Outdoor Wargaming System, Darkon grew from a handful of LARP enthusiasts to almost 2,000 members in 2005, with a small number of chapters dotting the country.

Darkon is notable for its age and media coverage. The club was featured on two Fox News broadcasts and in a CNN story by Oliver Janney. On June 3, 2009, a segment featuring several members of the club was featured on National Public Radio. There is also an award-winning feature-length documentary based on the club, Darkon.

Administration of The Darkon Wargaming Club is composed of three official governing bodies: the "Executive Board," the "Noble Council," and the "Senate." The Club administration is run much like the United States Government, with a system of checks and balances to prevent one body from gaining too much power.

The group has various tie-ins with local park services and other public-grounds administrative bodies, meaning they often have opportunities to set up their events in public parks and nature preserves as well as through personal arrangements with private farmers, landowners, and high school and college grounds.

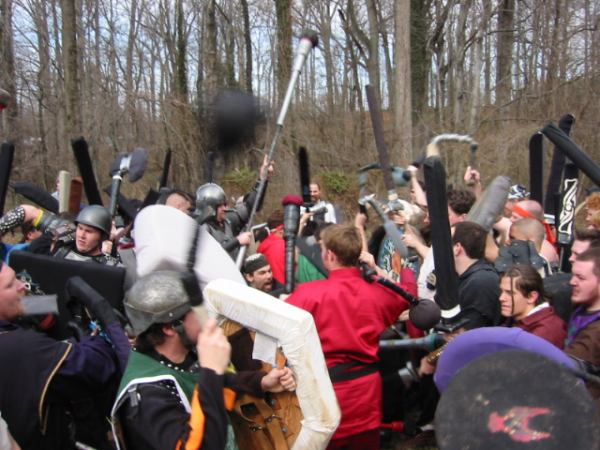
"Meatgrinder" battle in Darkon

== Club administration ==
=== Executive Board ===
The executive board of Darkon handles the day-to-day administration of the club, such as finances, registration, records, and contact with other LARPs. Members of this governing body are the official representatives of the Darkon Wargaming Club. The Board is composed of:

- the President, who acts as chief representative of the Club when dealing with outside officials, and makes final interpretations of Club Rules,
- the Vice-President, who chairs the Noble Council, serves as chief liaison with other LARP clubs and stands in as chief executive in the President's absence,
- the Secretary, who maintains the Club Roster and official records,
- the Treasurer, who is the chief financial officer of the club and maintains the club finances and ensures payment of accounts payable, and
- the Magistrate, who chairs the Senate, maintains the club's safety Marshals, and makes final interpretations of Club Bylaws.

All Executive Board members are elected annually by the Senate.

=== Senate ===
The Senate of Darkon is made up of one or two representatives from each country (team) in Darkon. Duties of the Senate consist of introducing and voting on new rules and bylaws, electing executive board members, and making specific Club decisions. Additionally, the Senate may overrule any official decision made by the executive board.

=== Noble Council ===
The Noble Council is a governing body consisting of Club members who have earned the title of "Knight of the Realm" through Club service and high esteem of the Club members. It is this council's task to ensure that safety policies and practices are being performed by Club members at all times, and to discipline those who violate such policies.

Individual Knights are held to a higher standard and expected to maintain conduct becoming of their rank at all times. Knights are expected to serve as Elders (referees) and safety Marshals periodically throughout the year. Any Knight may challenge the Noble Council in a contest of arms in order to gain a higher title (such as Baron, Earl, Marquis, Count, Duke or Prince) and the right to play the class Cavalier. They may also go up in higher rank via promotion from the High King or the Noble Council.

Those who wish to gain nobility must submit a petition to the Noble Council. Based upon that player's merit, the Council may then accept or deny the applicant. However, Nobles approved by the Noble Council may be decommissioned by the Senate if seen unfit. Additionally, the Noble Council may bestow the title of "Knight Errant" on any Club member. Knights Errant are Nobles in title and must be regarded as such, but they do not have voting rights on the Noble Council.

== Gameplay ==
=== Countries and retinues ===
Darkon is made up of a number of teams, or "countries". A country is a group of players, usually friends, who have all pledged allegiance to the same leader, agreed to wear the same country symbol, and fight for the same goals. Country rosters are fairly static; players may drift from one country to another, but for the most part, membership in a country is very personal and moving is generally an important decision (as it is in real life).

All countries in Darkon have some type of recorded history. The history may be the actual history of a Medieval or ancient nation (such as Sparta) or may consist of pure fiction. Most countries select a fictional background as it is generally easier to roleplay. Countries also exist on a map kept by the administration of Darkon. Land "hexes" may be discovered and claimed, wars (both land and naval) may be fought, and cities, ships, and other structures may be built. The amount of land a country owns has a direct impact on how much in-game money (represented by gold- and silver-colored metal coins minted by the Club administration) is earned.

Presently there are nine officially recognized countries in Darkon; they are Aquilonia, Ched Nasad, Chendrolyn, Drowned Isles, Elidor, Fatalia's Legion, Lost Company and No Quarter! There are also two officially recognized guilds: Jackal's Folly and Tempestas Alas.

Other countries/guilds may unofficially exist in the realm, but until they petition for recognition by the Club administration they may not claim hexes on — or earn money from — the map, nor engage in a land war.

Nomads are players who have no allegiance to any country. They generally are hired out (i.e. become mercenaries) by a country during an event.

Darkon also allows another form of unit, a Knight's Retinue. A person that has attained the title of Knight in the realm of Darkon may wear their own personal symbol on their tabard and manage their own personal army. The retinue members would all wear the same symbol as the Knight they serve under. Members of a retinue can sign in as any country and be members of any country.

=== Weapons ===
Darkon is full-contact padded weapons sport and therefore must be guaranteed safe for the players. Individual members of the club are trusted to build his or her own weapons in a manner consistent with the Club rules. The large selection of legal weapons available to players are one-handed swords, Two-handed swords, hand axes, battle axes, hammers, clubs, maces, spears, daggers, chained flails, quarterstaves, glaives, and halberds. Bows, crossbows, and specially-built javelins also may be used. At the simplest level, Darkon melee weapons are composed of a firm core with several layers of hard- and soft-cell foam taped or glued to it. Cloth must also cover the blade and pommel of every weapon. As of 2012, the club has decided to include weapons covered in a soft rubberized coat as an alternative to cloth.

Cores are made using various lightweight-yet-sturdy materials. Common cores are PVC pipe and the more expensive fiberglass. Wood and bamboo cores may only be used for spears. Metal cores are not to be used except with express permission from the Club administration.

Darkon players also use different varieties of foam for their weapons ranging from simple camping mats to high-end industrial foams. Adhesives are also used to keep the foam and core together in one solid weapon; contact cement, double-sided tape, and duct tape are the most common for this purpose.

Javelins are long tubes built using foam and adhesive, containing a ½" PVC or hollow fiberglass core.

Arrows and crossbow bolts are built using an actual arrow or bolt with the head removed. The tip of the arrow shaft is then padded with foam and secured with tape.

Siege engines are also in use in the game of Darkon for specialized battle campaigns. Siege weapons include ballistae, catapults, and trebuchets. While there are currently few specific rules governing the construction of a siege engine in Darkon, all siege engines must be built with the utmost degree of safety in mind. Ballista bolts are built much like javelins, while catapult/trebuchet stones are cloth balls filled with cotton fiber, known as "spellballs" (please see the Magic section of this article for more information about spellballs.)

=== Armor and shields ===
Armor and shields in Darkon afford a player special protections against physical and magic damage. Armor may either be built by the player or bought (provided they follow the official specifications and safety guidelines), and can range from a basic leather bracer or greave to full plate armor. In Darkon, leather armor must be at least 5-ounce genuine leather (Pleather is not acceptable) and metal armor be made of steel, brass, or bronze. Damage taken while wearing armor is determined by the type of weapon versus the class of armor worn. For example, chain mail (Armor Rating 2) worn on the torso would give the player one extra hit versus a "black weapon" (i.e., two-handed sword, halberd, "black" glaive, or battle axe), and the second hit would result in a mortal wound.

Shields are ½" pieces of plywood (¼" for bucklers) wrapped in hard- and soft-cell foam and covered with cloth. Any weapon (save for the Arrow of Piercing relic) may be deflected by a shield and cause no damage as long as the weapon does not solidly strike the individual before or after contact with the shield. Shields may be destroyed by a halberd, certain-sized two-handed axes, or via the Mace of Disruption relic in three solid hits, or the Javelin of Lightning relic in one hit. Additionally, certain magic spells such as Warp Wood or Lightning Bolt destroy shields.

Shields may block some spells (i.e. Word of Holding) but not others (i.e. Curse).

=== Magic ===
Like most fantasy role-playing games, Magic is used in Darkon as part of the fantasy spirit of the game. Magic takes place in the form of spells, written by the player, which must be read in order for the spell to be invoked. Spells may be offensive (i.e., Fireball), defensive (i.e., Cure Light Wounds), or utility (i.e., Hold Portal) in nature. Most spells that affect other characters utilize a "spellball," which is a round cloth ball stuffed with cotton fiber. The color of the spellball determines the magic's effect. For example, a Mage could read the Lightning Bolt spell from his or her spellbook, then throw a blue spellball at his or her target. If the target is hit, he or she takes a specific amount of damage to the area of the body hit. Every spell is different and it is the player's responsibility to know the effect of every spell.

Green damage spellballs are used specifically with siege engines in the game, and causes immediate "death" to any player directly hit by it. Those within a three-foot radius of the spellball's landing point are "mortally wounded," which is to say he or she becomes incapacitated for 5 minutes and will "die" if not properly healed. The green spellsballs are also used in the Druid spell "Nature Love".

=== Roleplaying ===
Roleplaying, or "acting out one's character" is a prominent part of Darkon. Players may elect to roleplay a valiant nobleman, a cutthroat rogue, a chaotic abomination of some magic-twisted species, or anywhere in between. Additionally, all players choose a race for their character, be it relatively mundane (e.g., human), literary (e.g., elf, dwarf, sprite) or godlike in power (e.g., storm giant). Race may play a large part of a character's motivations in Darkon. For example, one who has chosen a Drow would usually roleplay as a member of an evil and treacherous race of elves whose sole ambition is money and status.

There are no set rules for roleplaying. Darkon contains a large spectrum of players, from those who play entirely for the competition of the fight and do not engage in roleplay, to those who do not fight at all and spend the majority of their time in the game roleplaying their character.

Furthermore, a player is in no way required to reveal his or her personal agenda or background to another player, though it is generally considered good form to truthfully respond when a player asks, "What [race] do I see?" Players may outright answer or simply give a short visual description of themselves.

During "Adventure" events, plots are put into place in which the countries of Darkon work together (or against each other) to fulfill a quest, solve a puzzle, and/or defeat an enemy. Roleplaying is of particular importance at these events, as the overall "plot" of Darkon exists from one Adventure event to the next. Roleplaying still exists in "Battle" events (events where no plot is outlined; members simply fight), though to a much lesser degree.

== Culture ==
Members of the Darkon Wargaming Club come from all walks of life, yet a strong sense of camaraderie exists regardless of background, social status, or any other factor. One thread usually common to all members, though, is a hobby for gaming in general, whether it be video games, tabletop role-playing games, or others.

Some players who meet in Darkon often end up becoming lifelong friends. Darkon has also been responsible for the occasional marriage or two.

As with most other subcultures, Darkon utilizes a vocabulary of slang borne of all live-action roleplaying games. "Rhinohiding" (the act of "blowing off" one's hits; also known as "ego armor"), "powergaming" (splitting hairs in the rules in order to gain an advantage), and "metagaming" (using out-of-game knowledge in-game in an advantageous fashion) are a few examples.

== See also ==
- Amtgard
- Belegarth Medieval Combat Society
- Boffer
- Society for Creative Anachronism
- Dagorhir
- Darkon, the documentary based on The Darkon Wargaming Club
