= Jugger =

Sport inspired by the 1989 movie The Salute of the Jugger

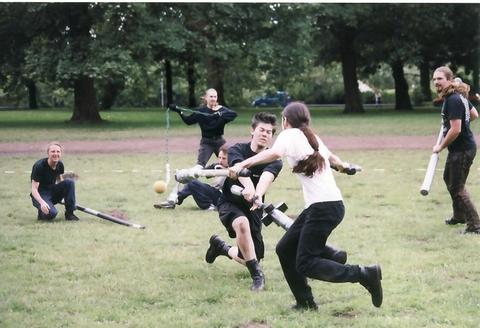
- The Hannover Living Undeads in the middle of a Jugger match
- First played: 1995

Characteristics
- Mixed-sex: Yes
- Type: Ball game, team sport
- Equipment: Skull-shaped ball, prop weapons, stakes or mounds
- Venue: Field

Presence
- Country or region: Spain, Germany, Australia, Ireland, United States, United Kingdom, Poland, Spain, Canada, Sweden, Latvia, Lithuania, Czech Republic, Colombia, Argentina, Italy, Israel

Jugger is a sport inspired by the 1989 film The Salute of the Jugger (released as The Blood of Heroes in the United States), in which a game of the same name is played. The film version was invented by the film's stunt coordinator, Guy Norris, and its writer-director, David Webb Peoples, for the movie. The transformation into a real sport happened independently in Germany, the United States, and Australia in the late '80s and early '90s.

Several variations on the game's rules exist: some focus on teamwork, speed, and agility, and are referred to as "sport jugger"; while others more closely resembles the aesthetics and intensity of the game played in the movie, most commonly referred to as "wasteland jugger."

Jugger as a sport is gaining popularity in Germany, especially with university and college teams, with its own league. There are teams in Australia, New Zealand, Austria, Ireland, England, Poland, Czech republic, Denmark, Spain, Sweden, Colombia, Costa Rica, The Netherlands, Latvia, Lithuania, Canada, Mexico, Argentina, and Romania.

The first international jugger tournament took place in Hamburg, Germany on 20 May 2007 between the Irish team Setanta and a number of the Northern German teams. In 2008, Australia and Ireland came to Germany to take part in the 1st German Open, making it the first two-continent tournament in jugger. The bi-annual World Club Championships regularly see teams and players attending from 4 continents (Europe, Australia, North America, South America).

== Goal ==
The goal of the game is to collect the ball (a.k.a. "skull" or "jugg") from the center of the field and place it in a goal ("mal", "mound", or "castle") at the opposite end of the field from where one's team starts. Teams are composed of 5 players, of which one is allowed to touch the ball. This player is known as the "qwik" or runner. The remaining four, known as "pompfers" or enforcers, are equipped with padded weapons. These four make room for their runner to get to the goal by "tagging" players of the opposing team with their weapons. They can also continuously "pin" opponents by holding their weapons to them.

The game begins with the runners engaging in rugby-style wrestling to get the control of the ball. The game ends after a particular number of points have been scored (often 5 or 7) or a particular amount of time has elapsed, often 200 stones (a stone is a unit of time in the game, each lasting 1.5 seconds) or 5 minutes.

== Equipment ==
- Skull: a "ball" made to resemble a dog skull, usually made of foam and tape which must be carried to the opposite end of the field.
  - (German: Jugg in "Berlin tradition", or, Schädel in "Hamburg/Dilettanten tradition"): (not an actual dog skull as in The Blood of Heroes, as an actual dog skull would break). In Germany and Ireland, a dog skull made of cellfoam, covered with latex, is used.
- Mounds: In most countries, a pyramid with the top cut off and a centre hollow is used. (German: Mal)
- Weapons:
  - A staff, 180 cm in length,
    - Australian rules have a 110 cm striking zone at one end and another in the middle, creating two distinct hand grips. Thrusting is not allowed.
    - German rules also state thrusting is not allowed.
    - Americas rules state thrusting is allowed but discouraged
  - A Q-Tip, 200 cm in length, double-ended striking zones of maximum 60 cm, thrusting is allowed
  - A longsword, 140 cm in length, thrusting is allowed
  - A short sword and shield, short sword 85 cm in length, thrusting is allowed; padded shield, 60 cm in diameter
  - Two short swords, each 85 cm in length
  - A chain, 320 cm in length with optional 50 cm club attached to the handle end (replacing 50 cm of chain). The ball of the chain is at least 20 cm diameter and soft.

Traditional timekeeping is done with a gong and 100 stones: The stones are thrown against the gong to keep time. One hundred stones per third, three thirds per game. Alternatively a drum or speaker system is used, with the drummer keeping count of each beat (known as a stone). One hundred stones per third, three thirds per game. In conjunction with official equipment, smartphone applications such as Jugger Stones or Jugger Match are sometimes used for scorekeeping and/or drum beats.

== Roles ==
A team is composed of the eight following persons, five of which are allowed to be on the field:

- One qwik (sometimes spelled quick): An unarmed player, and the only one allowed to touch the skull
- Maximum one chain: A player armed with a chain
- Three or, if no chain, four enforcers (German term: Pompfer): Armed with their choice of weapons (except chain). May handle the skull with their weapons
- Up to three substitutes, who may replace any player between points

=== Roles (in the film) ===
In the film The Salute of the Jugger (or 'The Blood of Heroes'), each role is heard at least once in the dialogue:

- Qwik – Kidda (portrayed by Joan Chen) and other characters in the movie refer to this role a few times throughout the movie.
- Slash – Sallow (portrayed by Rutger Hauer) is described as one (and refers to others) this role. Both Sallow and Gonzo are described as "Slashes" in the movie.
- Drive – Cim (or Big Cimber, portrayed by Anna Katarina) or Mbulu (portrayed by Delroy Lindo) are described as such, and only once, by Sallow when he, Cim, and Mbulu are debating midway through the movie.
- Back Charge – Mbulu (portrayed by Delroy Lindo) or Cim (or Big Cimber, portrayed by Anna Katarina) are described as such, and only once, by Sallow when he, Cim, and Mbulu are debating midway through the movie.
- Maserer – Young Gar (portrayed on Sallow's team by Vincent D'Onofrio) .

== Rules ==
=== Germany ===
Based on the rules of the German jugger community, as published at jugger.org:

- the playing field is a rectangle with clipped corners – so an octagon
- weapons are known as pompfen, and are divided into shields, chains and spars
- a team consists of a maximum of eight players per game: exactly five field players and up to three substitute players
- each team must have exactly one runner (qwik) on the field
- a maximum of one chain player is allowed

=== Australia ===
The objective of the game is for the team's qwik to get the foam dog skull, or jugg, into the opposing team's mound to score goals, while minimising the number of goals the opposing team scores within the time limit. The enforcer's role is to defend their Qwik from the opposing players.

==== Positions ====
Australian rules jugger is played with two teams of five juggers: three enforcers with pompfen, one chain and one qwik.

Qwiks
The qwik is unarmed and the only player who can carry the skull. The two qwiks start outside the centre circle and when the game begins wrestle for the skull. The enforcers may not enter the circle until the skull or the whole body of one of the qwiks leave the circle. A qwik's hands and forearms are not considered a hit zone and may be used to block.

Enforcers
The enforcers wield various classes of padded pompfen (listed above)

Historically there could only be a maximum of two of the same class of weapon among the other enforcers, but this restriction has been lifted. An enforcer can pin another player by resting their weapon on the hit player at any time while the player is kneeling. Even with paired shorts or Q-tips, a player can only pin one opponent.

Chain

The position of chain wields a ball-and-chain of plastic and foam up to 320 cm long. The chain can have a 50 cm handle (replacing 50 cm of chain) with a striking surface which can be used to tag opponents for a regular Spar penalty count.

==== Timekeeping ====
Most games consist of two halves of 150 stones each, while tournament finals are three thirds of 150 stones. Historically kept by throwing stones against a gong, now other methods such as drums or speakers are used. Stone beats are now 1.5 seconds apart when previously they had been 2.5 seconds apart for matches of 100 stones per half.

==== Hits ====
Stone penalties for hits vary between countries from three to five for the spar/pompfen and five and eight for the chain. Australia played three and five until 2017 when they adopted five and eight.

When a player is hit by the other team they take a knee and are inactive for the count of five stones.
If hit with the ball of the chain they take a knee for a count of eight stones.
Unsafe head hits incur a penalty on the hitter of eight stones for safety.

Strike locations are from the neck down (excluding hands on cored weapons or the entire forearm from the elbow down for qwiks). All strikes in jugger are touch, so there is no need to hit heavily or try to cause injury.

=== Australia 'POX-ECLIPSE' ===
A jugger league was formed in Western Australia in 2018 with an aim to resemble more closely the activity seen in the film. The league was formed by a Blazing Swan (Burning Man regional event) theme camp called The Church of Belligerence. The game has recently found a new home at POX-ECLIPSE, Australia's first major 'Wastelander' event.

The games consist of three rounds of 100 stones (approximately one stone per second). A round is over once 100 stones have been thrown or a qwik places the jugger (dog skull) on the mound on the opposite side of the field. In the case of a tie, a fourth round of 100 stones will be played.

All players are required to over act their hits. As such, if a substantial hit lands on one's leg by a staff act as if it were a metal rod that did so thus carry a limp for the rest of the round.. Any player who is ignoring hits against them will be swapped out for a sub at the referee's discretion.

Each team consists of the following:

1. 1 qwik (running player)
2. 1 slash (captain - has busser)
3. 1 drive (has a rambasher)
4. 1 backcharge (has a rambasher)
5. 1 masserer (has a maser aka chain)
6. 2–3 substitutes

The naming convention of the players and their tools is the only version of the game played that adheres to the screenplay/movie naming conventions from The Salute of the Jugger.

The rule book to the POX version is available through Umbrella Entertainment alongside the 2025 remaster of the original movie.

==== Gameplay ====
Each qwik starts outside the central circle with the jugger placed inside. The two qwiks start outside the circle and may enter the circle once the first stone strikes, signalling the start of the match. Only the qwiks may enter the circle during the start of the round whilst other players may only engage once the jugger (the skull) has left the circle. The qwik is the only player that can handle the jugger at any time. The two qwiks are in continual vying for possession of the jugger and use their speed, agility and bare hands to claim the jugger. Once a qwik has the jugger they must successfully take the jugger to the other end of the field and place it on the mound to score a point, ending the round. Any time the qwik is hit in the arm or upper abdomen by an opponent they must release the skull. The role of the enforcers is to intercept the opposing qwik and/or defend their own qwik, ensuring them safe passage across the playing field. An enforcer who knocks over an opposing enforcer or qwik may choose to pin the other – keeping them out of play. This is done by yelling "pin" whilst holding their weapon against the back of the downed opponent. After five seconds they are released and can resume play. Note: an enforcer can manipulate the jugger with a weapon.

Contest: When the two qwiks are grappling over the jugger, the referee will declare "contest". Until one qwik has possession of the skull, enforcers are only allowed to engage with other enforcers or chain during this time.

The chain acts as a "goalie", limited to the triangular section at the end of each field. If the qwik is hit anywhere by a chain whilst in possession of the jugger, the qwik must drop the jugger.

Substitutes: jugger is an intensely aerobic game and substitutes will be on ongoing rotation as necessary.

==== Safety ====
There is a referee whose main objective is to identify and stop reckless play or poor sportsmanship. A whistle will be sounded in such instances and "check" called. When "check" is called, gameplay must cease and all players must drop to one knee until the issue is resolved.

- Control hits – as a player is about to make an impact, they should slow the momentum of the hit to reduce impact.
- If a player is concerned for their own or another's safety during the game, call "check".
- Minimum armour to be worn as per "Armour" page.
- No head shots or groin shots.
- No hits whilst down.
- All weapons are tested by an opposing team prior to the game to make sure they are adequately padded and safe.
- Medic/ranger is on-site.
- Water is readily available.

==== Weapons ====
===== Enforcer =====
Weapons are best made by wrapping a bamboo core in mattress foam until sufficiently padded. An additional lick of Qwik Grip on the core will help keep the foam secure. The mattress foam is then wrapped in gaffa tape until sufficiently secure. Types of weapons currently approved are trip stick, staff and smasher. Additional weapon types will be considered but will need approval from team captains.

===== Chain =====
Currently there are two types of chains – the bommy knocker and the double-headed flail. Plastic chain with a net at the end that encloses a soccer ball is the easiest chain to make. Segments of pool noodle can be then added to the chain at points near the impact area.

==== Armour ====
The aesthetic is a post-apocalyptic wasteland. Motorbike armour, car tire remnants, muay tai armour, piping, plastic webbing and other materials can all be glued or bolted together. The only requirement is that there are no sharp edges that could possibly hurt other players on impact. The recommended minimum is a mouth guard and helmet (or other head protection). Each team is to choose a colour that will help distinguish them from the other on the field.

=== WA Jugger League ===
A newly established competition Jugger League has emerged in the second half of 2023. Calling Mills Park, Beckenham home, the newest club to join the AJL (Australian Jugger League) seeks to introduce the sport of Jugger as an alternative sport opportunity due to its inclusive and mixed gender ethos.

=== Ireland ===
As with German and Australian jugger, the goal is to score more points than the opposing team within a time limit. These time limits are counted by a regular beat or stones on a drum, amounting to about two seconds to every stone. A tournament game is played for two sides of one hundred stones each, but during normal training sessions there are no spare players to beat the drum, so the game is usually played as the first to ten points or similar.

The game itself is played with two teams of five, with substitutes waiting behind the starting line. A full team consists of a runner, a chain, two staffmen and a chainblocker. Although weapons other than staffs can be used, staffs are by far the most common in Ireland. There can only ever be one chain per team at one time.

The pitch itself is rectangular with two mal (German for 'goals') at either end in the form of a foam square with a depression to receive the skull. The skull, a rubber dog skull serving as the ball, is placed in the middle of the pitch and at the end of a count by the referee or one of the captains both teams run towards the centre of the pitch and try to score.

When both lines reach the centre of the pitch the players try to "tap" each other out. This is done by lightly tapping the opponent with a legal surface of one's weapon on a legal body part. In Ireland, this means anywhere below the neck and above the wrists. Headshots are avoided and if a pompf hits the head before a legal target, the tap is discounted and the player must withdraw their weapon before hitting again. While a hit on the head after a hit on a legal target is still counted, it is frowned upon and avoided. If both players tap each other at the same time, or indiscernibly closely, both players are considered hit and go down. This is unlike in German rules where hits within half a count of each other are allowed.

When a player is tapped out they drop to the ground with one knee touching the ground. If they have been hit by a staff or other pompfen, they stay down for five stones. If they have been hit by a chain, they are down for eight stones. The count begins when the knee hits the ground and while the player may move to retrieve a weapon they must return to where they were hit before they start playing. A kneeling player may also pivot around on their knee provided they do not lift it.

While they are down another player may "pin" them by holding their staff on them. A chain player may not do this. As soon as their count is up any player except a runner must attempt to stand again. As soon as their knee leaves the ground, they are considered standing and can be hit although they must be fully standing before they can hit others. As a result of these rules, it is possible to abuse them by holding a pompf just above a person waiting to rise. They must rise as soon as they can and they are tapped out for another five stones as soon as they do. As a result, a rule was instituted that a pompf must be either pinning a kneeling player or three feet away; an exception is where there are two players kneeling in close proximity and it is impossible to pin one without having one's pompf close to another.

The purpose of all this is to break a hole in the opposite line and allow the runner a chance to score. Once a runner scores both teams reset to either end of the pitch, the skull is placed in the centre by the schiri, referee, and the victorious team is awarded the point. The game is quite comparable to Hamburg rules jugger, from which it originates, and is least similar to Australian jugger. Most of the following comes from IADT (Institute of Art, Design and Technology), in Dublin with plans to expand into UCD (University College Dublin) and DCU (Dublin City University), and is also played in the Institute of Technology, Tralee.

=== United States ===
Multiple variants exist within the country. Sport jugger is nearly identical to the European variant, with very subtle rule variations. Another game based on the same movie developed within the live-action role play (LARP) Amtgard and is referred to there as "jugging" and applies the LARP's combat mechanics to the game as seen in the movie. It is basically a battle game within a foam LARP, but very popular. Wasteland jugger is yet another variant, where participants wear heavy home-made armor and use metal weapons. Engagements are more like traditional combat, as the game is full-contact and uses such weapons as iron posts, axles, stop signs and metal chains to name a few.

The Colorado Jugger League or CJL is Based in Denver, Colorado, and was formed in 2014. The CJL plays with rules similar to their international counterparts. The CJL's primary form of outreach and communication is through their website and the discord, where they organize a yearly league season, free community events, and a national tournament. The CJL also hosts a YouTube channel which has recordings of past games on it. The CJL annual national tournament, called the Mile High Open, is regularly attended to by 10 or more teams and sometimes attended by international teams, such as the 2016 Mile High International. The CJL is open to all players age 14 and up, and hosts teams from various locations all over Colorado, with teams coming from Denver, Colorado Springs, Arvada, Littleton, etc.

The California Jugger Association was founded in September 2022 to foster a community aimed at growing the sport in California. Its current stated goals include:

- Serve as a discussion forum for all teams in California on any and all jugger-related matters.
- Facilitate tournaments and game days within California.
- Support the growth of new teams in California through sharing of information, material resources, and personnel.

As of October 2025, CAJA has nine member teams distributed across Berkeley, Stanford, San Francisco, San Diego, Long Beach, and Irvine. CAJA has its own discord server used as an online forum and meeting place for anyone wanting to partake in Jugger in California, as well as to funnel users to individual teams, which have their own local discords to coordinate practices. They follow the National Jugger Association combined ruleset, which is similar to the CJL's ruleset and was adopted for the major US tournaments in 2023, such as Mile High Open.

There is another association known by the abbreviation "CAJA": The Carolina Aggressive Jugger Association is another American jugger league that aims to hold truer to the movie than its European counterparts. Formed September 2010, they seem to have fallen into a state of inactivity, evidenced by their (lack of) Facebook activity. They had their own rules and regulations. Drawing from C.U.J.L., European leagues, as well as the movie itself, they allowed use of much denser cores, hardwoods specifically, (with metal being allowed only on-chain weaponry and shields) and require only one layer of closed-cell padding at least 1/2 inch thick. This came with the implementation of armor covering vital areas; the head, a majority of the ribcage, forearms, shins, and the entire spine were to eventually have required protection. Additionally, their field was considerably smaller than most, last known at 75 ft by 40 ft. The smaller field was chosen to compensate for the additional fatigue caused by armor usage, as well as to place players closer to one another, which CAJA felt was more accurate than the usual playing field. They skirmished in Longs, South Carolina (just out of North Myrtle Beach). Players ages 14 and up were welcome to watch or participate as either players or support crew.

The Competitive Underground Jugger League or C.U.J.L. (pronounced "cudgel") is a group based originally out of the American Midwest that began in 2009. In their league, the weapons are made of rattan with impact surfaces padded with strips of mountain bike tire. Helmets, knee guards, and hand protection are required gear as outlined in their codex. Teams in the league compete each season for the "Bucket of Blood" trophy.

The USJL (United States Jugger League) is organized with the intention of building jugger teams that play by similar rules to those found internationally so that the US will have an opportunity to take part in the international tournaments. The USJL rulebook and other information can be found on the USJL website.

Jugger Ohio is a group formed in October 2010 that is based in the town of Marietta, Ohio. Using very similar rules, field size and equipment to its international counterparts, Jugger Ohio has also embraced social media as a viable way of communicating. It continues to organize weekly and bi-weekly matches via Facebook to great effect. They are organizing the first-ever American jugger tournament, dubbed "The Dogskull Classic", planned in the style of the German Open. This event is slated for 13 August 2011 in Marietta, Ohio.

The Red Dirt Jugger Club is based in Oklahoma City, Oklahoma, and was formed in June 2010. Oklahoma plays with German-style rules, and has grown to over 50 members. A league was formed in the fall of 2012 and seven teams of six have been formed and are preparing for league play. Oklahoma City and its outlying suburbs play every weekend.

==== Hits and strike zones ====
- USA (Jugger Ohio and Red Dirt Jugger Club)

When a player is hit by the other team's enforcers they take a knee and are inactive for the count of five stones.
When a player is hit by the ball or the connecting chain, they take a knee and are inactive for a count of eight stones.
Hits to the hands, head and groin do not count as a hit, and the groin and head shots incur an eight-stone penalty to the offending player. All else is a legal hit, including feet, shins, legs and arms.

A variant of jugger is played within the UK's Lorien Trust LARP system, the world championship being held at the system's sporting event the Great Edrejan Fayre.

Versions of the game are also occasionally played by SCA armoured combat fighters.

Jugger matches are held at the yearly post-apocalyptic festival Wasteland Weekend in California.

== Media ==
- Wickenhäuser, Ruben Philipp: Jugger. A post-apocalyptic sport for all occasions, Morrisville 2008, ISBN 978-1-4092-2920-9 Website
- I am Jugger, documentary film that shares the origin and the present of the sport

== See also ==
- Buzkashi
- Wasteland Weekend
