= Foam weapon =

Padded mock weapon

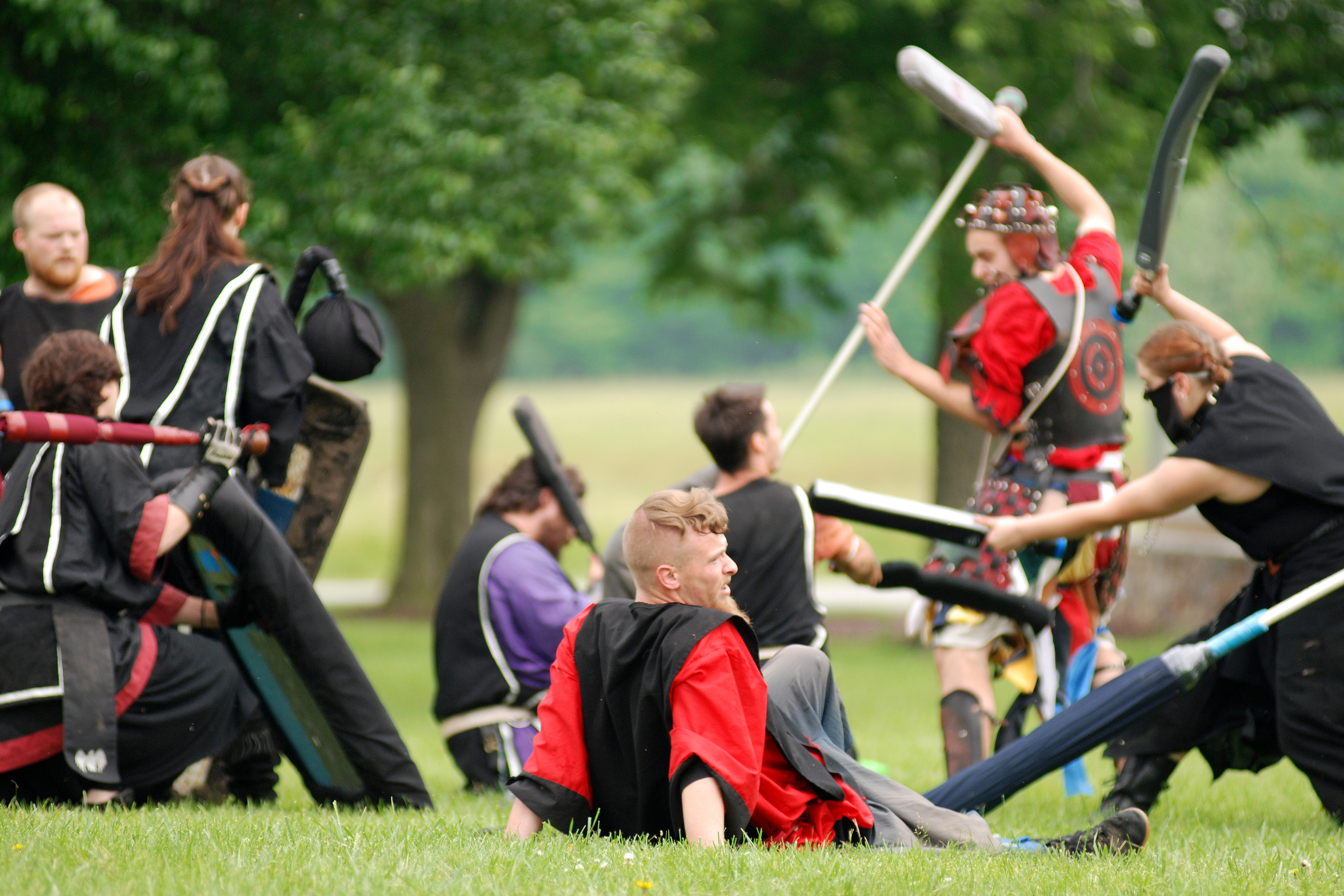
A Dagorhir battle which shows a variety of foam weapons and shields being used.

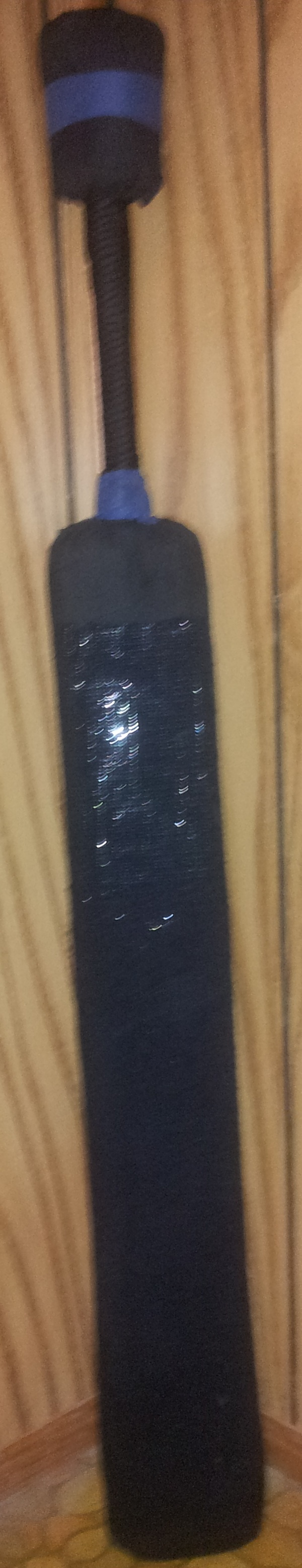
Standard "blue" weapon made from a fiberglass core, open cell foam padding, strapping and cloth tape, a cloth covering and a rope around the handle.

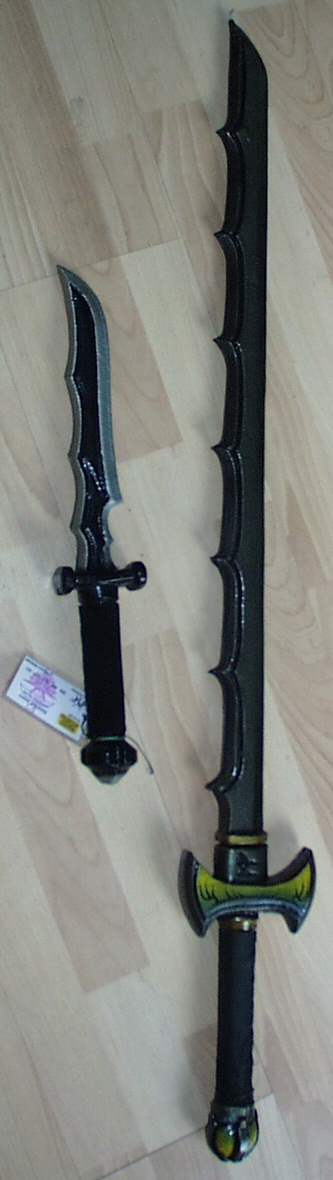
A latex sword and dagger.

A foam weapon, also known as a boffer, padded weapon, or latex weapon, is a padded mock weapon used for simulated handheld combat. Such weapons are used in simulated battles called battle gaming and in some live action role-playing games (LARPs).

== Terminology ==
In the United States, there are four major types of foam mock weapons used in medieval combat sports, battle gaming, and LARPs. They can be defined as:

- boffer weapons: The term "boffer" refers to a particular construction of weapon that involves a single piece of PVC pipe confined by a layer of foam and duct tape. This type of mock weapon, although it has padding, is not suitable for unarmored high impact fighting. It is commonly used in LARPs where participants must perform touch combat by pulling back on their strikes at the last moment.
- heavy boffer weapons: These mock weapons are similar to standard boffer weapons, but they are reinforced on the core pipe with strapping tape. They are used in full power combat with the participants wearing a significant amount of safety equipment (armor). This type of mock weapon is primarily used by the Society for Creative Anachronism (SCA) in their youth combat program.
- latex weapons: Throughout Europe, almost all modern sword-fighting games use molded foam swords of latex rubber. These weapons are often airbrush painted with a slick latex covering. The weapons are only lightly padded and require players to use only touch contact and pull back on their blows before striking. The weapons have little support at the tip and do not lend themselves to thrusting. These mock weapons are starting to be used in United States LARP games.
- padded weapons: The padded weapon, or foam weapon, is a creation of the American battle gaming movement. Padded weapons typically have at least twice the padding found in traditional boffer weapons. They also tend to be lighter than traditional PVC boffers, as they are usually built on fiberglass or carbon fiber cores. All striking surfaces are covered with cloth to prevent the weapon from scratching uncovered skin. The combination of more padding, lighter weight, and cloth covering make these weapons ideal for the unrestrained fighting that is found in most American battle gaming groups (Amtgard, Belegarth Medieval Combat Society, Dagorhir, Darkon Wargaming Club, and High Fantasy Society).

In Europe and the UK, the terms latex weapon and LARP-safe weapon are more common, and combat is usually referred to as LARP combat. Non-latex foam weapons are primarily used in Jugger and in the Finnish LARP community.

== Boffer weapon construction ==
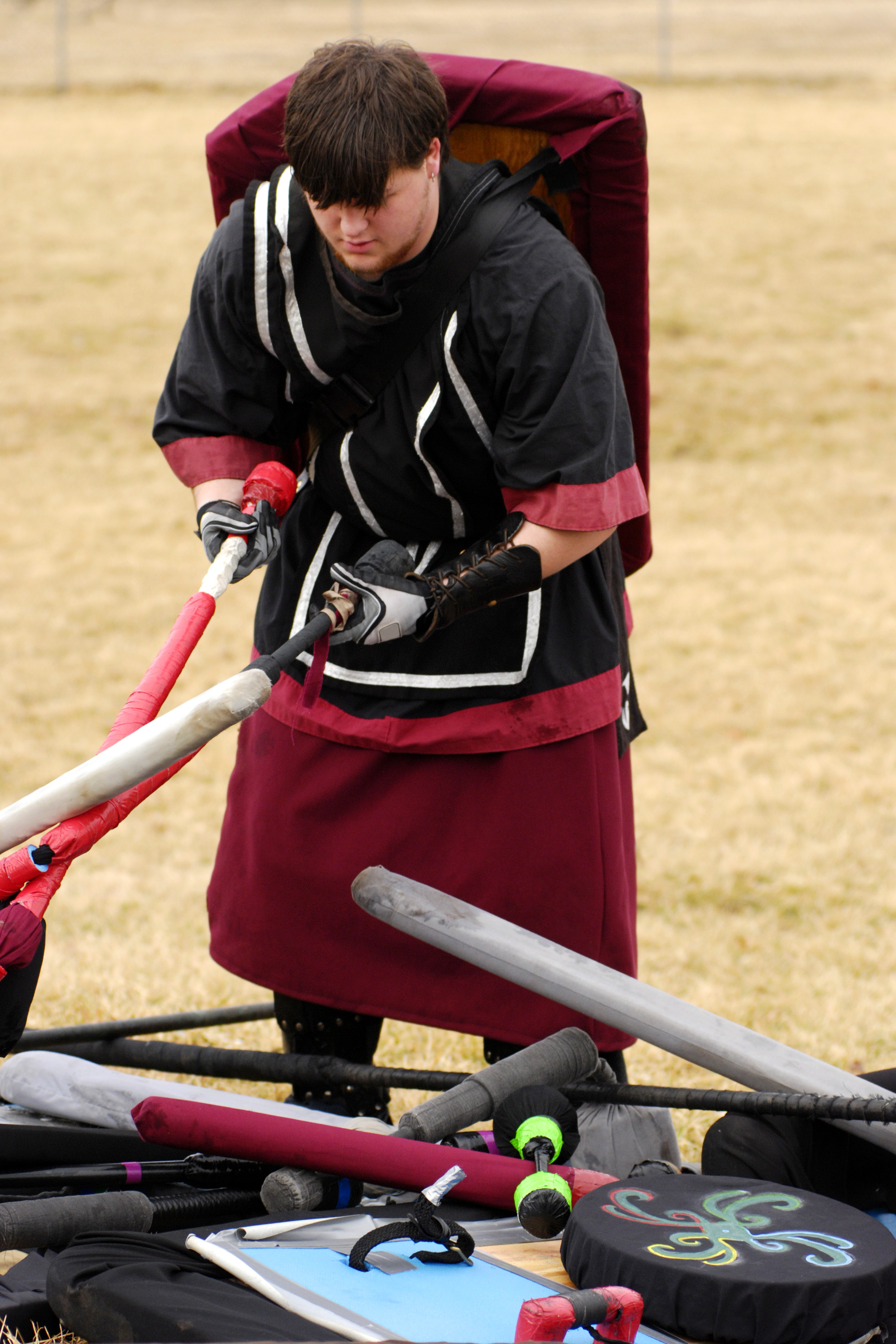
A member of Dagorhir checking foam weapons and shields for safety before a match.

The primary concern in designing a foam weapon is safety; a pulled blow with a foam weapon should not hurt the target, and in systems that allow it, even a full-strength blow should not cause injury. Combatants who consistently fail to pull their blows are liable to be ejected from an event, or at least pulled out of the fighting for safety reasons. The weapon also needs to be durable, to withstand the stresses of combat.

A secondary issue is aesthetics; often, a foam weapon is designed to look something like a real weapon such as a sword or an axe, sometimes with detailed adornment. The weighting and balance of a foam weapon can also affect how easy it is to use in combat.

Normally, there are several main features of a foam weapon: a core, padding, thrusting tips, various forms of functional and artistic flourishes, and an outer coating or shell.

=== Core ===
The most important piece of a foam weapon is its core, which acts as the shaft of the weapon and gives it its initial shape. Cores made out of PVC, graphite, fiberglass, carbon fiber, bamboo, or aluminium are used, with standards varying between groups and countries. Graphite golf club shafts are presently the cores most commonly used in the United States, whereas solid fiberglass or carbon fibre rods are the cores most commonly used in Europe.

Some core materials can be bent into a number of shapes to give variety and uniqueness to a weapon. A common way to bend a PVC core is with a blow torch or kitchen stove; however, heat guns or boiling water are preferred by some as these methods deliver even heat, to prevent burning or weakening of the core. Rattan is generally soaked in water and then moulded to fit a shape.

Some groups wrap tape around the core as reinforcement and to limit damage should the core break.

=== Padding ===
Once a core is decided upon, a layer of foam padding is glued around it. Sometimes a core is inserted into a pool noodle, either full length or cut into smaller pieces, which makes a firm, yet safe coating for the weapon. Sometimes pipe insulation is used. The general convention of most modern groups is that there must be at least one layer of stiff closed-cell foam for safety reasons. Some groups differ on the thickness required and this mainly stems from issues of safety and control. Some full-contact groups require more padding on striking surfaces.

=== Thrusting tip ===
Some foam weapons also feature a tip made of open cell foam or other foam types that allow a progressive give, which is often much softer and more compressible than the foam on the core. This allows for a wielder to execute a thrust on their opponent without fear of skewering them on the core or leaving bruises.

Most groups in Europe and the UK do not allow thrusting even if the weapon has a thrusting tip, due to concerns on the safety of such weapons. However, thrusting tips are much more popular in the United States where practitioners ensure that any weapons that risk the core piercing through the thrusting tip and into a combatant are failed in safety checks held before every game.

Depending on which set of rules are being used, the pommel of the foam weapon may also have a thrusting tip for striking with the bottom of the weapon. The thrusting tip at the bottom of the pommel is commonly referred to as a waylay tip, as its purpose is to be used to strike between the shoulder blades, simulating an assailant waylaying a victim. Even without this tactic, having a padded pommel is a common safety precaution as it provides added protection against accidents.

=== Flourishes ===
Once padding and thrusting tips are secured on the core, it is not unusual for the weapon to have added flourishes for aesthetic and practical purposes. If the foam weapon is to be an axe, a head carved out of open-cell foam may be affixed. Additional layers of closed-cell foam can be used to define a blade of a sword, the hilt of a dagger, or the soft foam "spikes" of a club. Foam weatherstripping is commonly used to better define a "cutting blade" as opposed to electrical tape. Flourishes allow for a great deal of artistic expression.

=== Coating or shell ===
The weapon is then covered with either tape (such as kite tape, gaffer tape, etc.), cloth or several layers of rubberised coating (such as latex) to protect the foam from abrasion and tearing.

One method within United States conventions involves a simple coating of duct tape to hold the outer foam together. The tape itself is used in many places to shape the foam and pull it into place, allowing for the artist to "carve" the weapon out as they work. Duct tape weapons also allow for easy repair of punctures by simply smoothing the shell out and applying a small patch of duct tape to the hole. Additionally, some United States groups use a cloth covering or opaque tights instead of duct tape. This practice is gaining almost universal acceptance with most groups moving to these systems.

Within European and Australian conventions, latex or rubberized coatings are generally considered the standard. Latex coating allows for levels of detailing and artistry through such techniques as appliqué moulds, and isoflex finishes with detail airbrushing. Some specimens are so stunning that, at first glance, they are difficult to tell apart from actual metal weapons. Latex weapons, however, are much more expensive (to both purchase and repair), and generally have a stiffer give on impact.

When solid coatings are applied over thrusting tips, many holes must be poked through them to allow the foam to deflate and re-inflate upon impact. This is generally not needed when coatings such as cloth are used, as air can pass freely through such media.

== Padded weapon construction ==
=== Core ===
Padded weapons are typically built on similar cores as listed for the boffer weapon, but some groups such as Markland use rattan cores.

=== Padding ===
Unlike boffer weapons, padded weapons are used in full force striking and therefore need more padding. For most American battle gaming organizations the rules specify approximately one inch of padding on the striking surface of any weapon under 24 ounces in weight. For weapons over 24 ounces in weight the padding requirement typically is increased to about one and one half inch of closed cell foam.

Most padded weapons are either formed using round (omni) blades such as pool noodles, or flat rectangular blades from layers of sheet foam. Adhesives such as contact cement, spray glue, or carpet tape are typically used to hold foam layers together.

=== Thrusting tip ===
Padded weapons used in American-style battle gaming are often used with full force blows. The thrusting tips must be elastic and compressible. The foam should be open cell of a density greater than or equal to 2.3 lbs per square inch. In addition, between the core and the thrusting tip there should be placed a ridged punch protector consisting of either a pipe end cap or small plastic or leather disk. The end of the core should also be covered or surrounded by a rip-resistant material such as a tightly taped small foam box, a layer of strong mesh tape, or some yoga matt that will prevent the core (which will whip back and forth) from sliding around the punch protector.

=== Flourishes ===
For safety all parts of the hilt (including pommels and guard) of the weapon should not easily fit through a two-inch hole. This allows the weapon to be used in unhelmeted combat without significant risk of causing eye injury.

=== Covering ===
To prevent skin abrasion from full contact strikes, all padded weapons may have cloth covers over all striking surfaces.

== Variations ==
Rules for constructing foam weapons vary a great deal from group to group as foam weapon fighting groups are usually small and tend to operate independently of each other. Foam weapon fighting groups also differ on the allowed weight, size, flexibility, thickness of foam, length of thrusting tip, and type of materials that may be used as a core. As a result, those who are into the sport, whether as a form of freestyle martial arts or within the context of LARPing, are generally encouraged to check with the rules of group with which they plan to participate, so not to bear the pain of disassembling and re-assembling a new weapon to make it in compliance with local standards.

== Usage ==
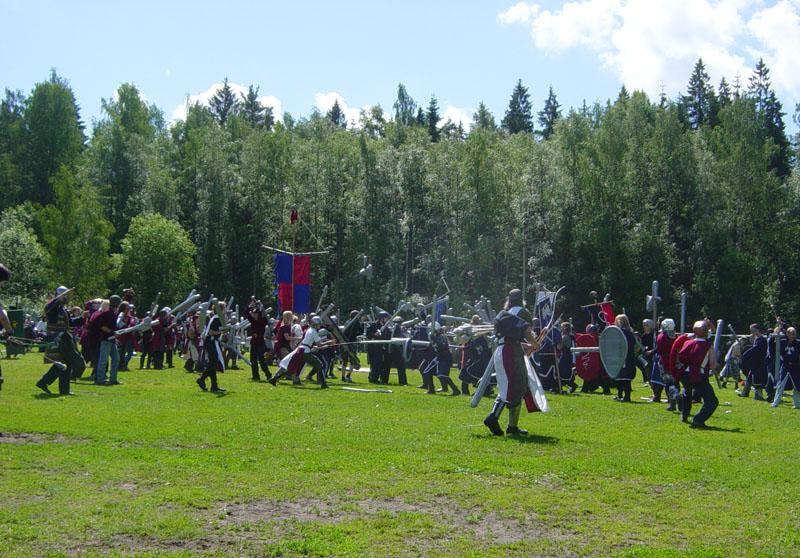
A 2007 Sotahuuto event in Espoo, Finland

=== LARP props ===
Boffer weapons are commonly used as props in live action role-playing games. While designed with safety in mind, these weapons tend to undergo more relaxed safety inspections as the fighters are usually not expected to use full-force blows.

=== Medieval combat sports ===
Foam weapons may also be used in fights more akin to martial arts tournaments, which resemble historical reenactment combat but require less protective gear. The scale of such tournaments may vary from individual duels to battles with hundreds of participants. One such organization is SCA armoured combat. Foam weapons are also used in some sport-like battle games such as Jugger. Foam weapons are used in the full-contact combat sport of buhurt, used primarily for training, and more rarely in niche tournament categories, primarily for youth tournament events.

=== Home use ===
Boffers are also made by individuals for use at home for fighting amongst friends and family. Typically these will be made without reference to the design standards of any LARP group.

== See also ==
- History of live action role-playing games
- List of live action role-playing groups
- Live action role-playing game
