= Swordtag =

Fantasy live action role-playing game

- Cover art by Mike Bjornson
- Designers: Brett Dougherty
- Illustrators: Mike Bjornson
- Publishers: The Adventurers' Guild
- Publication: 1988
- Genres: LARP

Swordtag is a set of rules for a fantasy live-action role-playing game (LARP) published by The Adventurers' Guild in 1988 in which players take on character roles, dress in "play" armor and fight each other with boffer weapons.

== Gameplay ==
Swordtag is set of basic rules for a fantasy LARP. Players can be one of nine character classes, largely drawn from Dungeons & Dragons, such as thief, mage, warrior, or bard. (In the updated Swordtag II booklet, this was increased to fifteen character classes.) The booklet gives an outline of combat and magic, and provides instructions on how to construct a boffer or create a wand of light from a paper towel tube and a flashlight. There are also suggestions on how to design costumes and equipment, where to play, suggestions on designing scenarios, and how to make fantasy work in the real world.

A referee sets up scenarios, judges combat and adjudicates party decisions. During one-on-one combat, well-padded players attempt to hit each other with boffers, scoring one point for each valid hit. The intrinsic value of declared armour decreases with damage, and there are rules for healing. Wizards involved in combat cast spells by hurling a small pouch at the target of their spell — if the pouch hits the target, the spell is successful.

== Publication history ==
The concept of Swordtag was created by Brett Dougherty and was published by The Adventurers' Guild in 1988 as a digest-sized typewritten booklet with artwork by Mike Bjornson titled The Adventurer's Guild Swordtag Rulebook. This was followed two years later by the updated and expanded Swordtag II – The Gamebook.

== Reception ==
In Issue 43 of Abyss (Spring 1989), Dave Nalle reviewed the first edition of Swordtag and called it "one of the most organized sets of mechanics I have seen, but as role-playing goes, they are extremely primitive." Nalle pointed out, "There is an interesting element of reality here which isn't found in other forms of role-playing." Nalle concluded, "Swordtag and its more violent cousins like Markland and the Society for Creative Anachronism, are not for everyone, but they are worth looking into if you can find a group in your area."

In his 1990 book The Complete Guide to Role-Playing Games, game critic Rick Swan was largely dismissive of the first edition of Swordtag, noting, "Swordtag is more of an outline than an actual game; in spite of some engaging ideas, there's barely enough information to stage a brief encounter, let alone an entire adventure." Swan concluded by giving the game a poor rating of only 1.5 out of 4.

Stewart Wieck reviewed Swordtag II - The Gamebook in White Wolf #27 (June/July, 1991), and noted that the most useful information was how to construct equipment such as helmets, shields and swords. Wieck concluded by giving this booklet a rating of 4 out of 5, stating, ""Overall, it's relatively simple to pass judgment on this product. If you're interested in Live-Action gaming, then this is a fine way to find out more and get involved immediately."
