= Wasteland Weekend =

Annual festival held in Edwards, California, US

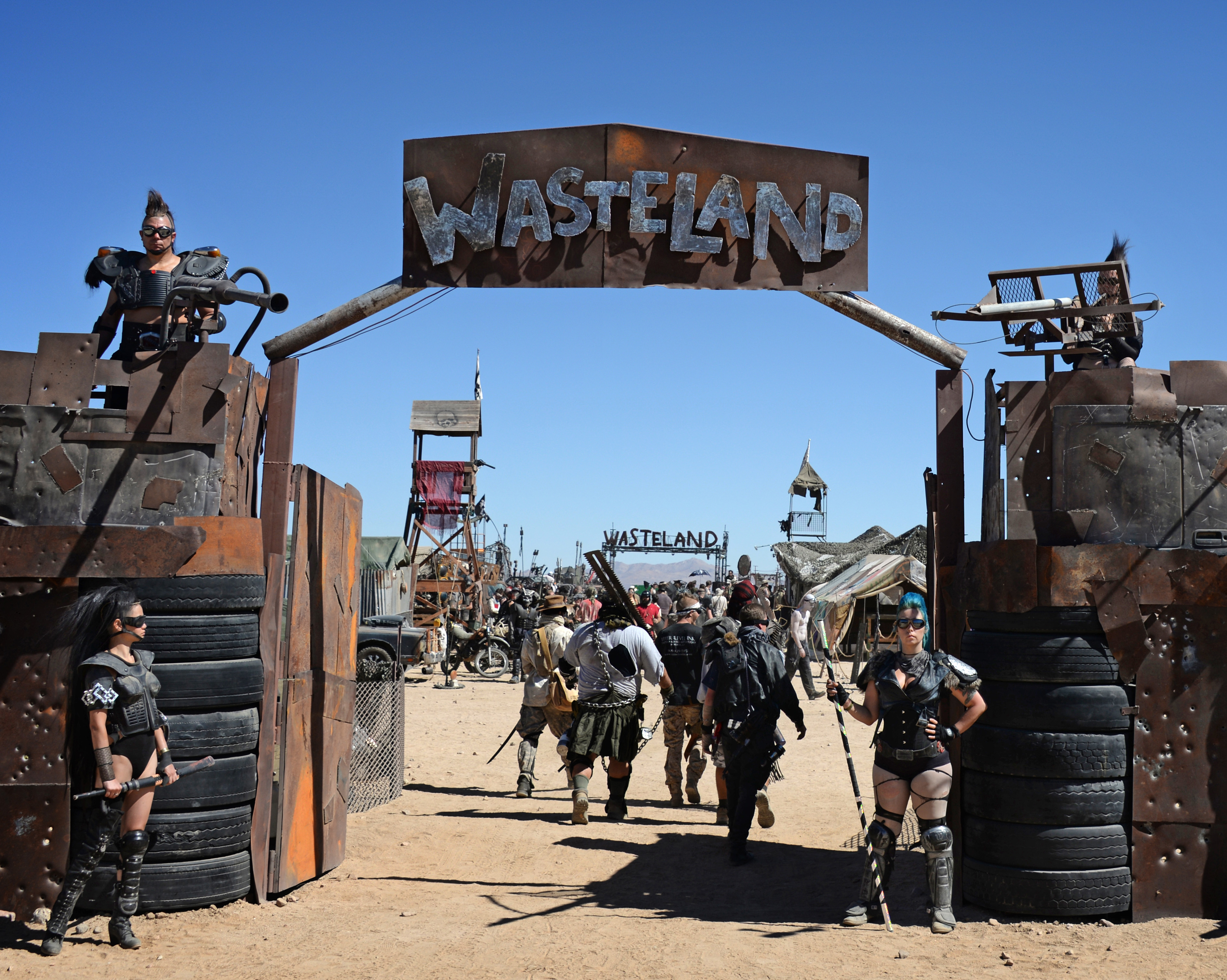
- Wasteland Weekend Main Gate
- Begins: September 25, 2024
- Ends: September 29, 2024
- Frequency: Annual
- Locations: Edwards, California, United States
- Years active: 16
- Inaugurated: October 22, 2010
- Founders: Karol Bartoszynski; Jared Butler; James Howard
- Attendance: 4,300 (2019)
- Organiser: Jared Butler; Adam Chilson
- Website: www.wastelandweekend.com

Wasteland Weekend is an annual four-day festival held on the edge of the Mojave Desert near Edwards, California. It is listed as a full immersion event, with all participants required to adhere to the set theme inspired by post-apocalyptic media such as Mad Max, Fallout and Wasteland. The festival includes themed costumes, campsites and vehicles, live bands and DJs, fire, burlesque and other performers, and Jugger matches.

It has been held annually in September since 2010, except for 2020, when the event was cancelled due to the COVID-19 pandemic. It is currently owned and organized by Jared Butler and Adam Chilson under their company Wasteland World Inc.

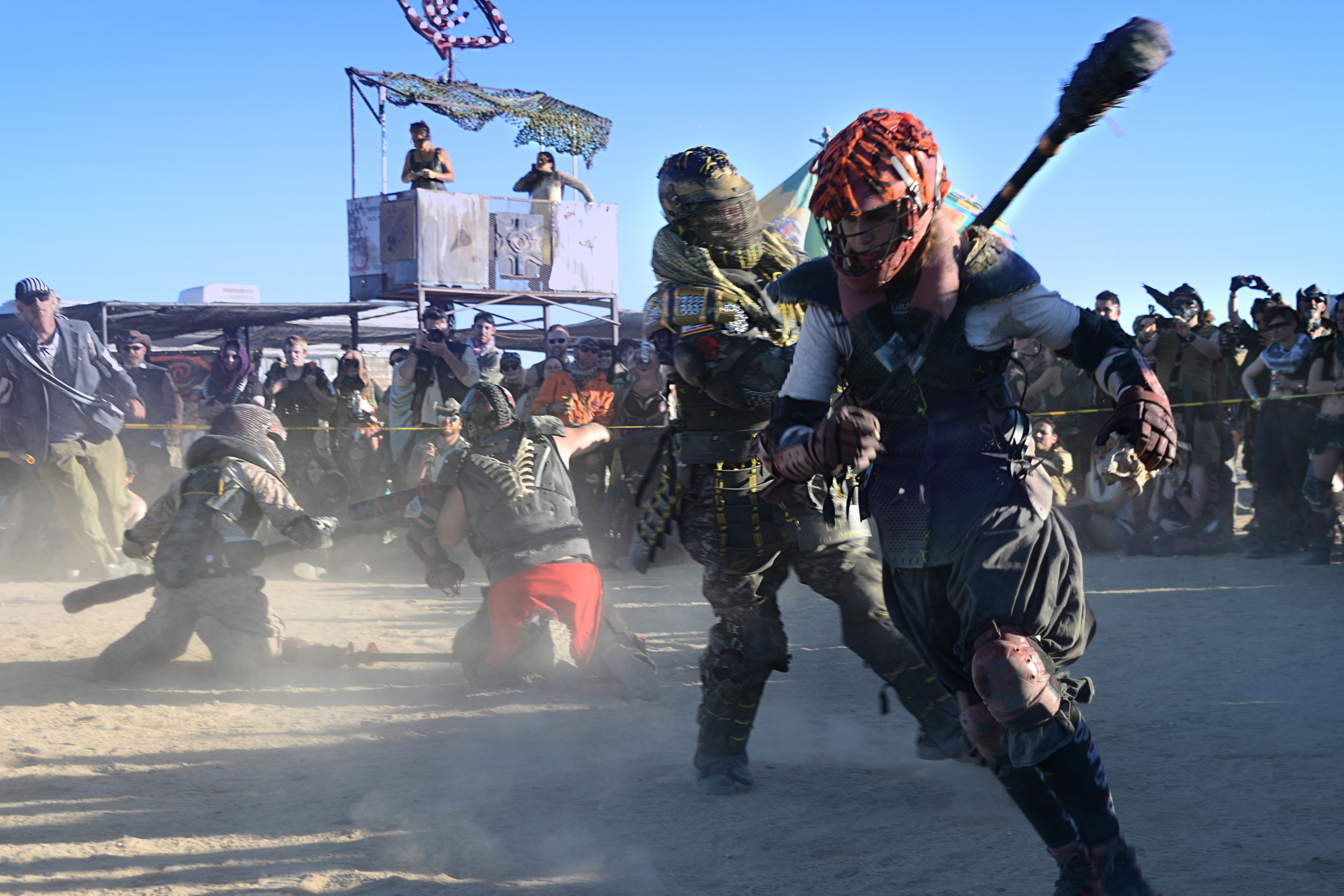
Jugger Match

== History ==
Wasteland Weekend has been held annually since 2010 after being founded by Karol Bartoszynski, Jared Butler and James Howard. The first Wasteland Weekend received media attention and a video greeting from George Miller, director of the Mad Max films. It has grown from approximately 350 attendees in 2010 to approximately 4,300 in 2019. In 2014, over 100 different themed cars and motorcycles were brought to the event.

Drawing on Mad Max-themed events in other countries, the first event was held in October in California City, California. It was organized by Karol Bartoszynski, Jared Butler, and club promoter Jim Howard. The event featured exhibitions of movie replica cars and bikes, a gyrocopter flyover, vendors, fire dancers, and contests. Co-founders James Howard and Karol Bartoszynski left management in 2010 and 2014 respectively.

In 2017, the event expanded from four to five days, beginning on the last Wednesday of September. By the tenth consecutive year in 2019, the sold-out event had over 4,300 participants. With 2020 being cancelled, year 11 was deferred to 22nd – 26th, 2021.

== Theme ==
The theme of Wasteland Weekend draws heavily from apocalyptic and post-apocalyptic fiction, especially the Mad Max franchise, and requires all attendees to wear appropriately themed clothing. In its early years, Wasteland Weekend was billed as "Mad Max fun in the California sun". Other influences include Wasteland and the Fallout series of video games.

== In media ==
Wasteland Weekend 2017 was featured in The Boulet Brothers' Dragula season 2, in which the four remaining competitors had to take part in a photoshoot in a nearby desert and perform as a group at Wasteland Weekend.

Adam Savage's Discovery, Science Channel show "Savage Builds" season 1 episode 3 "Mad Max Melee" featured Butler, several vehicles from Wasteland Weekend, and the festival's property.

== Additional events ==
There have been several official spin-off events from Wasteland Weekend and its organizers, including The Wasteland Film Festival (started 2013), The Wasteland World Car Show (started 2016), and The Wastelanders Ball (started 2017). The same team also launched an annual sci-fi and cyberpunk-themed festival, Neotropolis in 2022.
