= The Salute of the Jugger =

- Theatrical release poster by Enzo Sciotti
- Directed by: David Webb Peoples
- Written by: David Webb Peoples
- Produced by: Charles Roven
- Starring: Rutger Hauer; Joan Chen; Vincent D'Onofrio
- Cinematography: David Eggby
- Edited by: Richard Francis-Bruce
- Music by: Todd Boekelheide
- Production companies: Kings Road Entertainment; Handistom Investment; Kamisha Corporation
- Distributed by: Filmpac Distribution (AUS); New Line Cinema (US)
- Release dates: October 19, 1989 (AUS); February 23, 1990 (US)
- Running time: 104 minutes (AUS); 90 minutes (US)
- Countries: Australia; United States
- Language: English
- Budget: $10.5 million
- Box office: $882,290

The Salute of the Jugger (also released as The Blood of Heroes in the United States) is a 1989 post-apocalyptic film written and directed by David Webb Peoples, produced by Charles Roven, and starring Rutger Hauer, Joan Chen, and Vincent D'Onofrio. The film has inspired the creation of the sport Jugger.

== Plot ==
In a world laid barren by wars waged in the 20th century and now forgotten, most people live from hand to mouth in enclaves known as "market-towns" or "dog-towns", scrounging out a bare subsistence by harvesting hardy crops, raising dogs as food, and trading in trinkets from the past.

What little entertainment exists comes primarily from a brutal sport known as The Game. It is played by roving teams of players known as juggs, who challenge local teams. They make their living through the tribute paid by the townspeople when they defeat the local team, and their trophy is the town's dog skull. The Game involves two armoured teams of five attempting to score by placing a dog skull on the opposing team's goalpost. One unarmed player—the "quick"—runs with the skull while being protected by teammates from attack by the opposing team.

Not everyone lives in such poverty. The Nine Cities, buried deep underground, are home to affluent and powerful members of the aristocracy. Each of The Nine Cities fields its own team of juggs in an organization known as The League. League membership is maintained with a fresh stream of new players, veterans of the travelling "dog-town" games who have proven themselves by their collection of trophy skulls.

Members of The League live in luxury almost equal to that of aristocrats. Roving juggs dream of being good enough to attract The League's attention and, with it, all of the luxuries afforded a League player.

The team of roving juggs at the center of the movie consists of Sallow (Rutger Hauer), Dog-Boy (Justin Monjo), Mbulu (Delroy Lindo), Big Cimber (Anna Katarina), and Young Gar (Vincent D'Onofrio).

Sallow, the team leader, has played in the League of the Nine Cities before, but was cast out because of his indiscretions with an Overlord's wife. Kidda (Joan Chen), an ambitious peasant girl, joins the team after a game in her dog town in which she outplays her opponents. She and Gar inspire Sallow to challenge The League and expunge his past.

However, Kidda and Gar do not realise that the City games are about more than honour and victory; they will need to fight for their survival. The Game is played much harder and more ruthlessly in the Nine Cities.

After their challenge is accepted, the team have to face a lineup of the league's best players, who have been told to focus on neutralizing Sallow and destroying the team. However, Kidda holds her own against the league quick, and Big Cimber survives despite severe injuries.

Having survived the first round, something no challenger team has ever done, the team must go into the second round a player short, as Big Cimber is unable to continue. However, the team manager, Gandhi, agrees to step in.

Gandhi subdues one of the league players, and the team beats the league team, something that has never happened before. Sallow tells Kidda to "walk slowly" to place the skull on the pole, as the crowd cheers.

Following the match, league representatives are seen approaching Kidda. In the international version, Kidda and Gar are seen participating in the league and winning, while Sallow and the rest of the team have gone back to playing in the wastelands.

== Cast ==
- Rutger Hauer as Sallow
- Joan Chen as Kidda
- Vincent D'Onofrio as Gar
- Delroy Lindo as Mbulu
- Anna Katarina as Big Cimber
- Justin Monjo as Dog-Boy
- Hugh Keays-Byrne as Lord Vile
- Max Fairchild as Gonzo
- Gandhi MacIntyre as Gandhi
- Richard Norton as Bone
- Lia Francisa as Mara
- Steve Rackman as Samchin Jugger
- Gregor Jordan as New Qwik

== Production ==
The Salute of the Jugger was shot in 1988 in the desert of Coober Pedy, Australia, and at a small studio (a converted tobacco factory) in Sydney. Some of the beach scenes were filmed at Bondi Beach, whilst the ending of the international version was shot at a limestone quarry just outside Sydney.

Second unit directing was overseen by Guy Norris, who was also the film's stunt coordinator.

The first scenes shot on the production were the introduction of the Juggers, followed by the first jugger match. The last scene to be shot was the final scene, only present in the international version of the film. This scene starred the 4th assistant director Gregor Jordan as the New Qwik.

== Reception ==
Vincent Canby's review of the film for The New York Times described it as "entertainingly grim" and "an unusually successful film of its kind, a good, lean variation on the post-apocalypse adventure-thriller that looks into the future to see the Dark Ages of the past."

== Alternate cuts ==
The US theatrical version of the film was significantly shorter than the original version released overseas, with about ten minutes cut. The enforcers scene is replaced by a campfire sequence. The biggest difference is in the ending: in the American release, the credits roll shortly after the climax while the picture continues, showing certain conversations with music covering the dialogue. The longer cut includes denouement scenes.

The US DVD release of the film matches the US theatrical cut in being much shorter than the original film. Full versions were released on VHS in the early 1990s in Australia, the United Kingdom, Europe and Japan. In early 2001, various distributors began releasing the original cut on DVD, known as the extended version or by the title The Salute of the Jugger.

In 2017, a 2-disc Blu-ray set with both cuts of the film was released in Japan.

In 2025, Umbrella Entertainment released a 4K widescreen remaster of the original edit with a new colour grade from original cinematographer David Eggby. It was the first release of the film in its original 1.85:1 aspect ratio since its cinema release in 1989. The disc contains three different edits: The Blood of Heroes (91min), The Salute of the Jugger (104min), and The Workprint Cut (111min).

== See also ==
- Quintet (film)
