= Anna Katarina =

Swiss actress

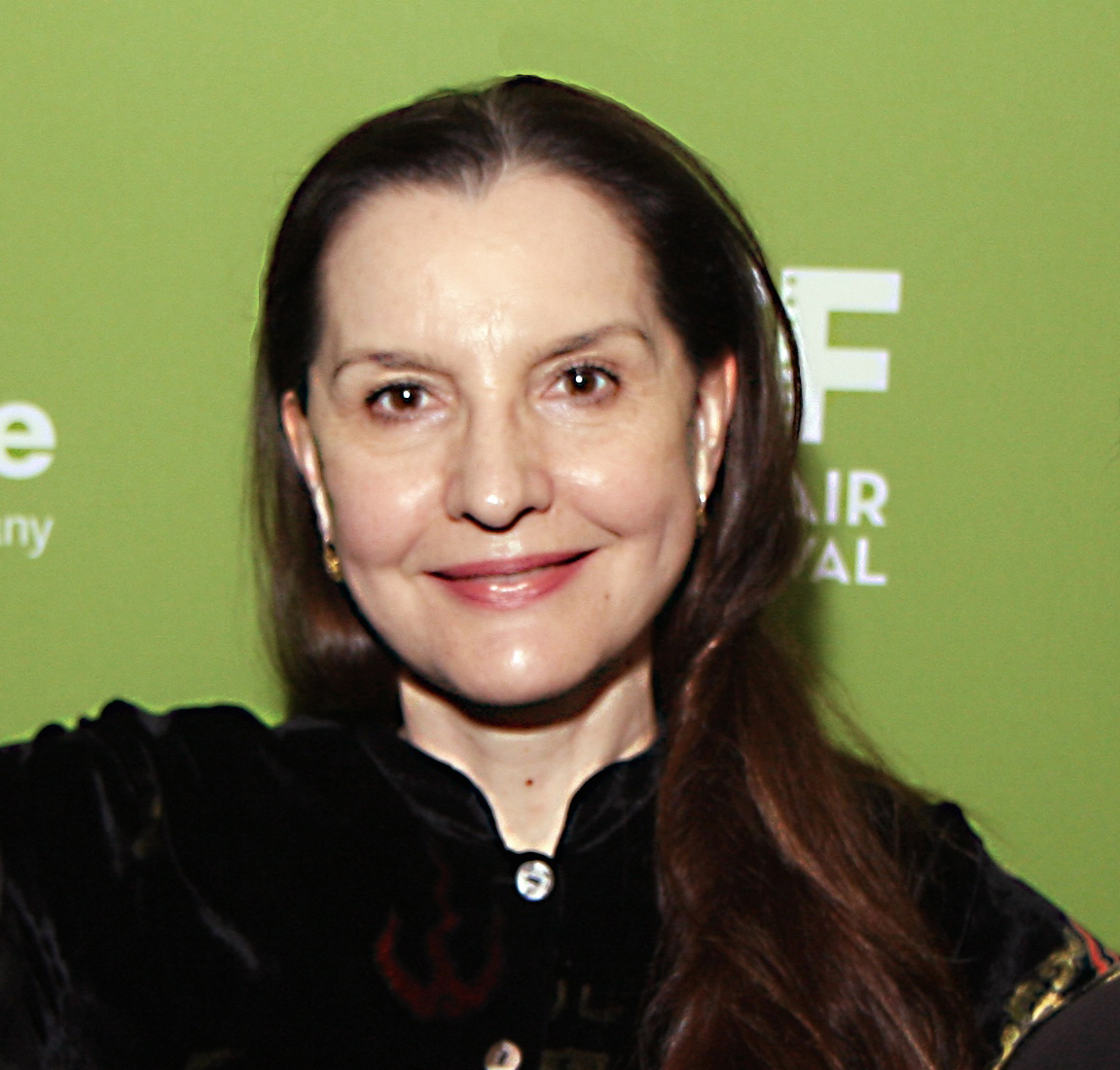
- Katarina at the Montclair Film Festival 2014
- Born: 14 March 1960 (age 66); Bern, Switzerland
- Website: annakatarina.com

Anna Katarina is a Swiss actress.

== Career ==
She came to the US in her twenties whereupon she joined a circus and acting school. She played the lead role of Tamara de Lempicka in the play Tamara, which ran in Los Angeles in the 1980s; prior to her, the role was played by Anjelica Huston.

Other roles include the Poodle Lady in the feature film Batman Returns and Isabelle Jeunet in six episodes of the HBO series Boardwalk Empire. She has made guest appearances in an episode of both Law & Order and its sister show Law & Order: Criminal Intent. She performed supporting roles in "Haven", an episode of Star Trek: The Next Generation; the TV movie The Death of the Incredible Hulk (1990), and the Pink Panther feature film remake (2006).

== Filmography ==
- Star Trek: The Next Generation (1987, TV series) – Valeda Innis
- Slaves of New York (1989) – Mooshka
- The Blood of Heroes (1989) – Big Cimber
- The Death of the Incredible Hulk (1990, TV movie) – Bella / Ashenko
- Law & Order (1991, TV series) – Elena Skolnick
- Batman Returns (1992) – Poodle Lady
- A Weekend with Barbara und Ingrid (1992) – Barbara
- Omega Doom (1996) – Bartender
- The Game (1997) – Elizabeth
- Law & Order: Criminal Intent (1997, TV series) – Helen Reynolds
- The Pink Panther (2006) – Agent Corbeille
- Zodiac (2007) – Society Woman (uncredited)
- Star Trek (2009) – Vulcan Council Member #2
- Angels & Demons (2009) – Docent
- Desperate Housewives (2010, TV series) season 6 épisode 7 : Ivana
- Boardwalk Empire (2010) – Isabelle Jeunet
- The Dictator (2012) – Angela Merkel
