= Belegarth Medieval Combat Society =

Battle game using foam weapons

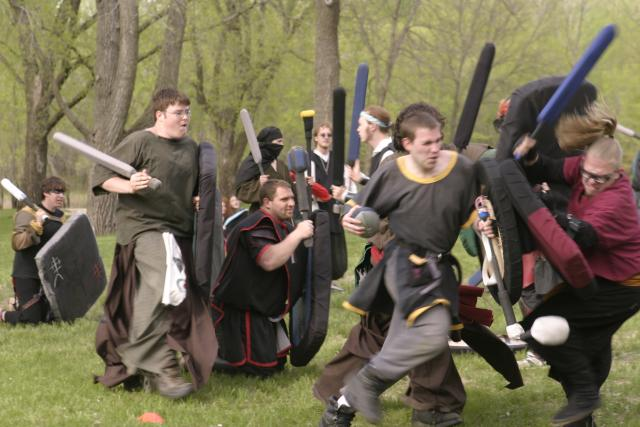
Fighters collide in battle

Belegarth Medieval Combat Society is a full contact battle game where foam weapons are used in order to prevent serious physical injury to participants. It differs from other battle games and LARPs in that it is entirely combat-oriented. Belegarth allows hard hitting, shield bashes, and grappling with little emphasis on role playing and has no magic or character classes. It is a corporation composed of a number of "realms" that can file for not-for-profit status, which compete at regional and national events every year. Typically, each realm also holds individual fighting practices several times a week. Realms vary in size from just a handful of people to over a hundred fighters.

The BMCS is a for profit entity but many of the realms under it have claimed Not-for-Profit status independently.

The organization initially formed from a set of loosely organized clubs and franchises starting in December 2001. In July 2002 the group was organized enough to incorporate in the State of Illinois.

== Gameplay ==
Belegarth Medieval Combat Society is a sport where participants fight with foam padded safety equipment made to reflect medieval weaponry. The sport's combat is hard hitting and fast-paced, governed by a set of easy-to-learn rules, and requires a level of skill and aggression that challenges its participants to be physically fit.

Gameplay is overseen by marshals, known as heralds (or referees) wearing yellow tabards. In the most basic sense, hits are scored by landing a blow with sufficient force to any of the four target-zones: torso, legs, arms or head. For safety reasons, the head is an illegal target for melee weapons, but is a legal target for missile weapons like arrows and javelins. A player is considered "dead" after a torso or head hit, or any combination of two extremities. "Dead" players are out of play for the remainder of the battle, which usually lasts five to ten minutes (depending on the battle scenario), and must act as such. Once the battle is over, each team regroups for the next fight.

During the event players are requested to wear clothing that is known as "garb", medieval or fantasy-based clothing. Players go by chosen Belegarth names to avoid confusion on the field as there are frequently numerous players on the field that share common given names.

== Non-combat ==
While some Belegarth participants choose to purchase their weapons from a number of vendors, many use weapons and equipment that they have made themselves, supported by Belegarth's creative community. Both in-person and through forums & messaging apps, Belegarth participants share new crafting techniques and sources for sturdier, lighter, and safer materials. As well as weapons, this community hand-makes other elements of the game such as armor and garb.

At multi-day events, the social aspects of Belegarth often expand to include activities such as bonfires and parties once the fighting is over for the day, with some participants coming just for the social get together.

== History ==
JRR Tolkien's novel The Lord of the Rings inspired a new-found interest in fantasy with the love of the outdoors, improvisational acting, and high energy events. A group called Dagorhir was formed in 1977 with these very ideals in mind. The theme was to catapult people from the 20th century into the midst of an intense battle during the Dark Ages; a time when the values and problems of the modern world did not exist. Dagorhir grew rapidly over the years into a nationwide organization. In 2001, in efforts to protect their intellectual property, such as the original Dagorhir Handbook, the Dagorhir Board of Directors requested that any group wishing to continue to use the Dagorhir brand name sign a legally binding contract regarding their use. Those that did not agree with this form of governance broke off from Dagorhir in order to form Belegarth.

== Chapters ==
Belegarth chapters, called "realms", range all across North America: from Puerto Rico up to Canada, and all across the continental United States. Chapters vary organizationally, ranging from realms to kingdoms, to loose confederations of "tribes" depending on the local chapter, its history and its membership. Chapters vary widely in size, age, interests, membership and geography, but a common interest in medieval combat unites them all. Belegarth: MCS includes a vast nationwide membership, and they encourage new members.

See The Belegarth Realm Locator for a complete list of Realms.

== National events ==
Realms gather at the national events, week or weekend long camping events, that involve fighting during the day and partying at nights, and where members wear garb and go by their dedicated Belegarth names.

- Orc Wars - mid March
- Spring Wars – early April
- Beltaine – early May
- Melcacorne – late May
- Armageddon – mid June
- Summer Wars - TBA
- Chaos Wars – late July
- Equinox – late September
- Oktoberfest – early October
- War of Wrath – mid October
- Winter War - mid November
- Battle for the Ring - mid January

== See also ==
- Amtgard
- Dagorhir
- Darkon
