= Dagorhir =

Foam weapon battle game

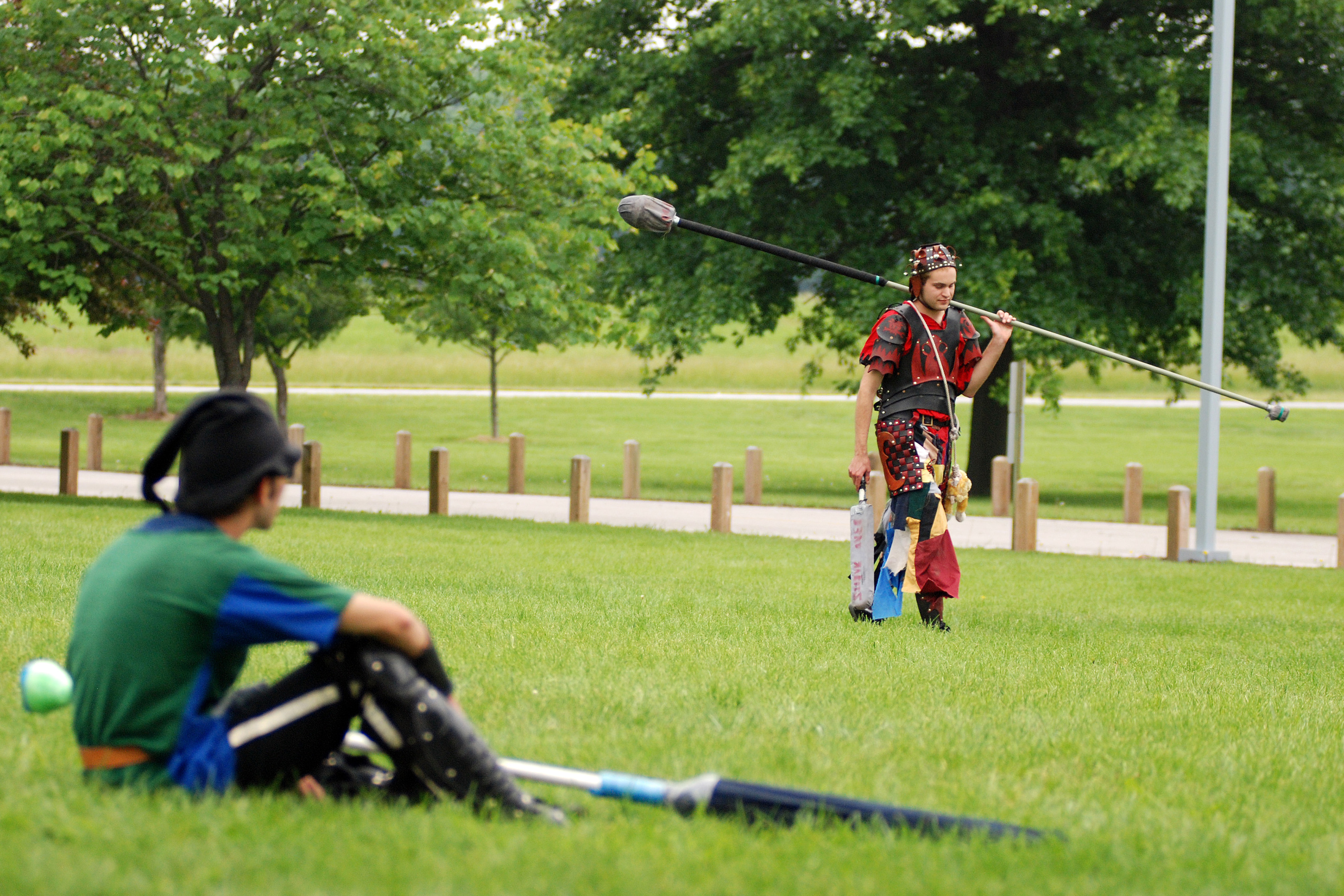
Dagorhir LARP foam fighter

Dagorhir Battle Games is a live action role-playing game (battle game) originating in the United States with full-contact melee fighting and ranged combat as its primary focus. Fighters typically use foam weapons such as swords, flails, spears, bows and arrows, javelins, axes, and other medieval weapons. Participants wear period costumes and are expected to stay in-character during events, although the amount of seriousness the role-playing aspect receives varies greatly by unit and chapter.

Founded in 1977, the Dagorhir brand has been licensed to groups in a few other locations, with hundreds of members spread throughout the U.S., Canada, Britain, Mexico, Puerto Rico, Germany, Australia, and Japan.

Unlike some other battle games or LARPs, there is no use of magic.

== Description ==
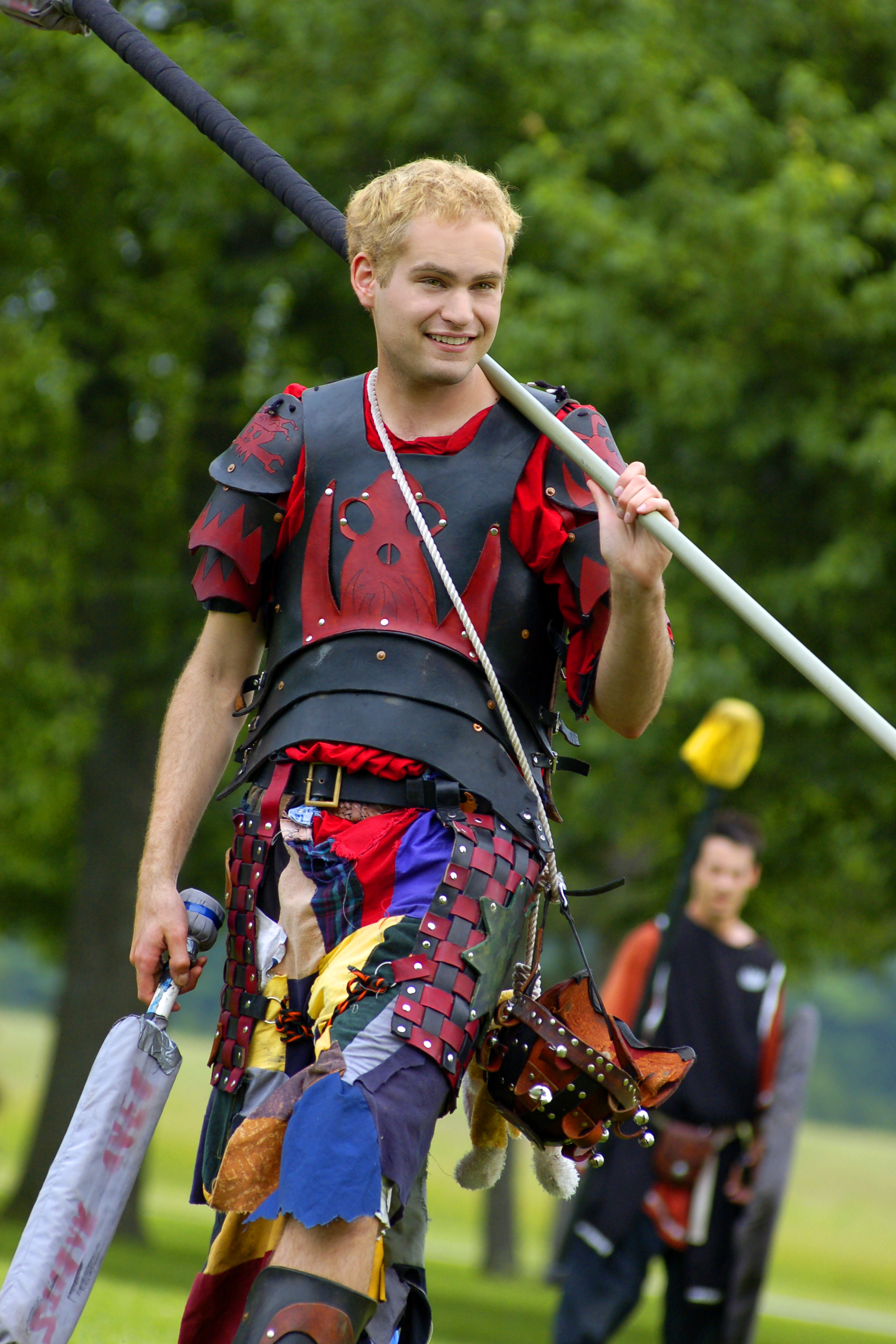
A fighter with self-made weapons and armor.

Dagorhir is a full-contact, live-action combat game, and combatants engage each other in battle with foam-padded boffer weaponry and equipment. To keep battles organized, realistic, and safe, the three main tenets of The Dagorhir Manual of Arms – safety, playability, and realism – are enforced by heralds (referees) during battles. The rules of the manual of arms, as well as those pertaining to combat, are upheld by an effective honor system which applies to all players. Dagorhir is a battle gaming group which is more akin to a wargame than a live-action roleplaying game (LARP). Dagorhir members have stated that they find the phrase "live-action roleplaying game" to be unfitting.

All weapons and equipment used during combat are inspected for safety prior to each battle, to ensure that they comply with safety rules. Although early Dagorhir weapons were typically constructed from crude materials such as couch foam and broomsticks when the organization was in its infancy, modern-day weapons are usually made from combinations of both open and closed-cell foam bonded to a fiberglass or PVC pipe core. Participants may also elect to wear protective armor, which gives users an advantage in battle. Fighters are organized into units of various sizes, organized along social lines and that generally fight and socialize together and are a club or fraternity of sorts. Units typically adopt a particular historical or fantastical race or nationality and dress, act, and fight according to interpretation of the group. Due to this melding of both Medieval history and Tolkienesque high fantasy, it is not uncommon for a Dagorhir battle to involve both mundane and fantasy themes and personas. A typical Dagorhir battle might involve Roman Legionaries and Saxon warriors locked in a battle against Orcs and Undead.

Dagorhir is strictly a weapon combat game, with no concept of "magic". Dagorhir also eschews the use of character classes in combat, instead allowing fighters to create and define their own styles of combat. Fighters are free to choose their types of armor, picks of garb, choices of weaponry, and styles of play.

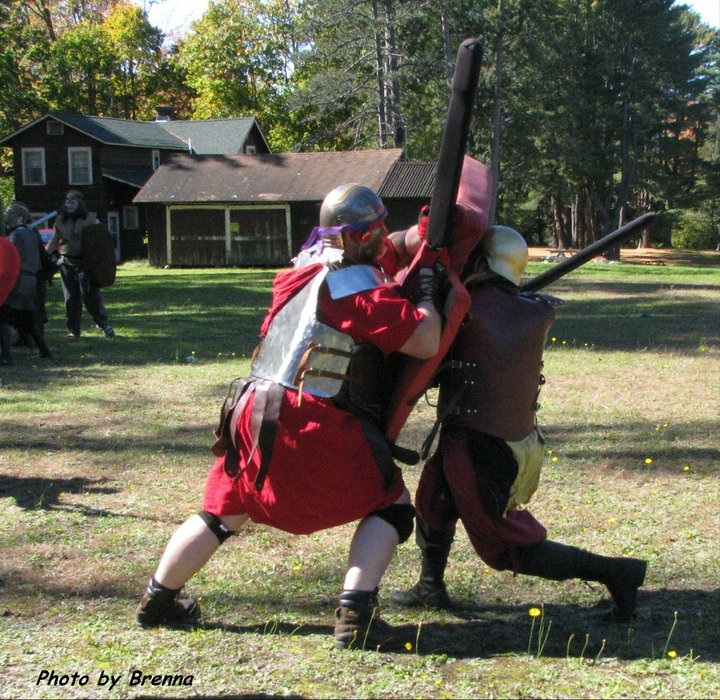
Dagorhir is a full contact game, shield rushing and bashing are common practices as seen here during A Clash of Kings 2

Realms and Chapters are organized by geography, and can range from between a handful of participants to several hundred. Typically a chapter will organize a battle weekly or monthly, with the various units participating, with occasional supplementary activities such as feasts, overnight camp-out battles, and even annual inter-chapter meetings. The largest annual Dagorhir gathering is known as Ragnarok. It is an annual Dagorhir tradition and in years of late, it has reached heights of nearly 2000 attendees during its week-long duration. The original chapter of Dagorhir, founded in 1977, is based in the Washington, D.C. area, and is known as "Dagorhir Aratari" after the founder's persona, Aratar.

== History ==
Bryan Wiese watched the movie Robin and Marian while reading The Lord of the Rings by J. R. R. Tolkien. He had never heard of medieval reenactment or Dungeons & Dragons but he wanted something to capture the spirit and adventure that could only come from wielding sword and bow. As 1977 rolled by, Bryan ran ads on the local radio station WGTB. Bryan then became "Aratar Anfinhir the Stormbringer" and Dagorhir was born into its first incarnation (as yet unnamed).

The club grew and in 1980 a Washington D.C. community TV show PM Magazine ran a half-hour episode where the host of PM Magazine spent a day at a Dagorhir battle game. After that point interest in Dagorhir exploded in the D.C. Area.

The explosive growth of Dagorhir took its toll on Wiese, who had coined the game as "Dagorhir Outdoor Improvisational Dark Age Battle Games" with more of a theatrical intent. The new flood of players were more oriented to sport. To combat this change, the Dagorhir Handbook was formalized. This included costuming requirements in an effort to encourage the players to think of it more of a theatrical game.

In the early eighties, the game spread Cleveland, Ohio. Then in 1983, PM Magazine ran a piece on Dagorhir to a national audience. The result was the founding of The Realm of Middle~Earth in Illinois. Dagorhir began to spread throughout the Mid Western U.S., and inspired spin off organizations, including Belegarth Medieval Combat Society.

Dagorhir has enjoyed extensive growth in recent years, expanding to an international membership of over a hundred chapters consisting of a total membership in the thousands.

On January 20, 2009, the Discovery Channel show Wreckreation Nation featured Dagorhir in its episode, "Demolition Derby."

== Meaning of the name ==
The name "Dagorhir" appears to be Sindarin, one of the Elvish languages created by J.R.R. Tolkien. It means "Battle Lord." According to the Sindarin rules of plural formation, the collective name for participants would be "Dagorhirrim," while two or more individual participants would be "Degyrhir."

== Membership ==
Dagorhir is open to the public, membership is free of charge (though larger events often have a nominal fee charged by the host to cover costs). Groups may keep an "armory" of appropriate weapons for loaning to new members and guests, but members are normally expected to purchase weapons, clothing, and optional armor. Participants are generally members of chapters, called "realms," which are formally licensed to use the Dagorhir name and related designs and documents. Participants are asked to sign and notarize a release form before joining a battle.

There is no list or estimate of the total number of Dagorhir members. An informal online effort to list members during the 2010s counted 1,486 people, with several realms not included.

== Major events ==
The largest national (inter-realm) Dagorhir event is Ragnarok. Attendance at Ragnarok from 2008–14 has averaged about 1,500, with the record being 1,627 at Ragnarok XXIX in June 2014. Ragnarok XXIII in June 2008 had more than 1,400 attendees, with over 650 actually fighting at the height of the event. Ragnarok XXIV, which took place in June 2009, attracted nearly 1,600 attendees. From 2001–9 Ragnarok was held at Spring Valley Campground in Cambridge, Ohio. However, after Ragnarok XXIV, the site of the event changed to Cooper's Lake Campground in Slippery Rock, Pennsylvania. Attendance since Ragnarok XXIX has grown to around 2,000 participants.

Groups across the nation hold events open to the public, and first-time fighters generally have their battle fee, if there is one, waived. While all local battles are open to any participant, there are battles such as a Crown War, that decide the "king" or "queen" of a realm. Then there are larger-scale regional events which typically draw over 100 fighters, as well as national events, of which Ragnarok remains the largest and longest running. In Fall 2006, the second major national event, named after the battle of Badon Hill, first took place in western Pennsylvania and drew over 350 attendees. Badon Hill now regularly has over 500 attendees, and the event was featured on an episode of the Discovery Channel's Wreckreation Nation.

- January:

Battle for the Ring (Anduril Empire) — Prado Regional Park, Chino, California (held every MLK weekend)

- February:

Winter Invasion (Maethodoron) — Blue Spruce Park, Indiana, Pennsylvania
Coronation – Unitarian Universalist Church of Utica, Utica, New York

- March:

Ides of March — Eastwind Castle, Trenton, South Carolina (Formerly at: Dragon Hills Retreat, Bowdon, Georgia until 2018)

- April:

Gates of Fire (Aratari, Gestiguiste) — Pioneer Park Campground, Somerset, Pennsylvania
Plains of the West – James A Bible Park, Denver, Colorado

- May:

Mayhem – Upper Marlboro, Maryland
Gates of Summer – Stewarts Farm, Holden, Missouri

- June:
- July:

Allthyng — Upper Malboro, Maryland

- August:

Summer Slaughter – Doe Lake Campgrounds, Umatilla, Florida

- September:

Eclipse – Spring Valley Campground, Ohio
Battle of Badon Hill (Aratari, Rome) — Pioneer Park Campground, Somerset, Pennsylvania
War of the Iron Fist — Stewarts Farm, Holden, Missouri

- November:

== See also ==
- Amtgard
- Belegarth
- Society for Creative Anachronism
- Darkon
