= Amtgard =

Live-action role-playing game

Amtgard is a battle gaming and live-action fantasy roleplaying and boffer combat game with chapters primarily based in the United States and Canada as well as Germany, Croatia, and South Korea.

== History ==
Amtgard was created by Jim Haren Jr, also known as Peter LaGrue, in El Paso, Texas in 1983. Taking pieces from the rulebooks of both Emarthnguarth and Dagorhir (both of which he had played previously), he advertised in the newspaper for an event known as "Attila the Hun's Birthday Brawl." Though only a few people showed that first day, it was a hit, and soon the game spread throughout the state and then the country. The largest concentrations of Amtgard chapters are in Texas and the Central United States, but groups are found throughout the United States as well as in Canada, Croatia, Japan, Finland, Germany, Korea, and Russia.

== Ruleset ==
=== Classes ===
Character creation in Amtgard is class-based; that is, players choose an archetype with pre-established abilities, similar to systems used by Dungeons & Dragons and other tabletop roleplaying games. For instance, one player might play an Assassin, and another, a Warrior. Players can increase the abilities of their characters by going up in level; a player's level is determined by the length of game time they have played that particular class. Advancement in a class is not tied to a specific character. Players may play different classes at different times, and levels have no relation to in-character deaths.

=== Combat ===
The primary focus of the rules of the game is combat. The abilities of the classes are generally related to combat. Non-combat oriented talents and attributes are often left up to the imagination and actual capabilities of the players or rules specified in a scenario.

Amtgard combat is resolved with actual physical fighting, though there are some rules in place to enhance safety. The weapons are boffer weapons (with less emphasis on realism and more emphasis on safety) but a player's physical ability, rather than game-based attributes as with other LARPs, determines the outcome allowing for a more realistic experience. Injuries are quite rare due to the stringent attention paid to safety. Contact is limited between fighters and non-weapon tactics like grappling or shield bashing are strictly prohibited. The basic combat rules are nearly identical to Dagorhir with a "limb loss" system based on hit location, in contrast to games such as NERO that are hit-point based. A hit from a weapon does not decrease a "hit point" total, but instead disables the location struck. A blow to the arm or leg disables the limb and a blow to the torso kills the player's character. Any combination of 2 limb shots also kills the player's character. Two limb shots to the same arm is also considered a death, while multiple shots to the same leg have no effect after the first shot. An exception to this rule occurs when a player chooses to "post" instead of kneeling, which is the normal requirement upon being struck in the leg. A player who chooses to post may remain standing, but is not allowed to move the wounded leg, save to pivot. Players may choose to post due to bad knees, rocky or wet terrain, or simply because they do not wish to kneel. Upon the "wounded" player declaring "posting" the leg is once again a valid target. If a player struck in the leg is kneeling and then raises the wounded knee off the ground, it is a valid target. Amtgard fighting tends to be fast and precise, focusing more on accuracy than on power.

=== Magic ===
Like many boffer LARPs, and unlike Dagorhir, Amtgard uses magic spells. Magic, another important aspect of Amtgard, is handled primarily either by audible incantations or by thrown "spell balls", small, safely-padded, brightly colored projectiles. Of the 12 Amtgard classes, 4 are considered to be "Magic Casters". In contrast to the 8 "Melee" classes, Magic Casters receive spell points at each level. Spell points are used to purchase various "Magics" which vary from a healing spell to the ability to turn an ally into an Undead Minion. If a Magic Caster wishes to use weapons (save daggers or magic staves) or armor, they must purchase them using spell points.

=== Armor ===
Amtgard also utilizes armor for a number of classes. Armor grants anywhere from 1 to 8 points to a covered hit location. Armor receives a rating based on the type of armor and materials and techniques used to construct it. Each class is able to wear armor ranging from 0 to 6 points. A player may wear armor that is rated higher than the maximum allowed by their class, but it only grants armor up to the class maximum. Regular weapon hits to covered locations remove a single point of armor, however, several classes, spells and creatures are able to remove additional points per blow. Combat involving armor is simple in Amtgard. There are essentially three kinds of damage armor may be subject to. Normal melee attacks remove a single point. Armor breaking attacks will remove one point of armor from a location with more than three points, and all remaining points from a location with 3 or less points. An armor destroying attack will remove all armor from a location struck. Other class abilities enhance all armor worn to "Ancestral Armor", which is removed one point at a time, regardless of the type of damage it is being struck with. As armor in Amtgard is not physically functional, realism and aesthetics are encouraged with armor in Amtgard, in order to enhance atmosphere and balance the substantial benefits offered by armor. Non-period, modern-looking materials and shoddy construction can reduce the protection granted by the armor.

=== Battle games ===
Battle games range from one-on-one tournaments to team battles of forty or fifty people to mass warfare with hundreds of players. The largest "grand melees" are held at the major annual events and can incorporate hundreds of members from chapters all over the world. Conversely, scripted "quests" can involve just a dozen or two participants, and may involve puzzles as well as combat. The ditch battle, or trench battle, is a simple form battle that involves weapon use only, not full class play.

== Setting ==
Unlike many other fantasy roleplaying games, Amtgard has no established "backstory" to its world. The setting encourages and incorporates elements of historical Europe and Asia as well as the high and low fantasy genres. Elements from steampunk and post apocalyptic fiction are not unheard of, and the only real rule governing a characters back story is that they be compatible with a swords and sorcery setting.

== Society ==
Amtgard has a cultural side as well, emphasizing various cultural fairs and competitions as well as various forms of creative expression. Amtgarders often create their own garb and equipment.

Two important structures in Amtgard culture are the Fighting Company and the Household, both voluntary memberships. A Fighting Company is essentially a military structure, much like a "clan" in any multi-player video game, whereas a Household is devoted to some cultural or personal goals, such as the arts, benevolence, common interests, etc. Both generally place a high value on contributing to the club as a whole, and often have a specific mission statement.

A number of slang terms have evolved within the Amtgard community, a few of the most common are as follows:

- Battlegame – Any type of game involving more than two players.
- Full Class Battle A game where all players are playing a class, all magic and class abilities may be used. These game generally involve at least 2 teams, and sometimes involve monsters.
- Ditch Battle / Ditch – A melee only form of in-game combat where players line up in opposing sides and engage one another. No classes, no class abilities, no projectile weapons, no armor, and shields are indestructible. Only melee weapons and shields are permitted. When all players on one side are eliminated, the first player to be killed on the winning team switches teams and the next round may begin.
- Trench Battle / Trench – See Ditch Battle.
- Stick Jock – A player whose focus is almost entirely on the combat aspect of the game, many Stick Jocks prefer ditching to battlegames. The term is borrowed from the Society for Creative Anachronism and though originally pejorative, it has been "taken back" in recent years.
- Ditch Monkey (Trench Monkey) – A player that primarily "ditches" (see Ditch Battle and Stick Jock).
- Sluffer (Slougher) – A player who fails to accept a valid hit, intentionally or otherwise. As in to "slough" a hit, as a reptile would slough (shed) its skin. In short – a cheater.
- Ironhide / Rhinohide – A person who ignores hits in combat, cheating (wittingly or not) to avoid taking damage. Also used as a verb as in ironhiding or to rhinohide. A subset of sluffer.
- Flurb – A person who focuses more on the roleplay and fantasy aspect of Amtgard. Players described as Flurbs generally prefer full class battles and are believed to be poor fighters. Originally pejorative.
- Hate Stick – A weapon constructed to pass a cursory weapons inspection, possibly even "legal" by the rules, but utilizing various methods of inflicting more pain than a normal, safe, weapon. These weapons are used to increase the probability of a sluffer accepting hits. The legality of these weapons varies on a case-by-case basis. The use of these weapons as a tool of compliance is generally frowned upon, and instead players are encouraged to communicate with opponents to minimize confusion.

== Awards and honors ==
Amtgard has a system of awards and honors based on past contributions and accomplishments. There are incremental awards for all sorts of arts and crafts, ranging from sewing to singing to armor smithing. By achieving 10 ranks of most awards one might also attain the Masterhood for that award. As an example, someone who is very generous and works hard to benefit the province of Amtgard as a whole may gain Orders of the Rose. After attaining 10 Orders of the Rose, one is eligible to be given the title Master of the Rose. The ruling body of each sub-chapter can also create awards for specific actions or talents that aren't included in the standard selection. The inclusion of a standardized awards system that has encouraged and advanced the Arts and Sciences in Amtgard.

Amtgard's honor system includes not only awards but titles and ranks as well. Titles such as Lord/Lady, Duke/Duchess, Marquis/Marquise, and Viscount/Viscountess are titles bestowed on members in recognition for work in the game or holding offices.

The most sought after title in Amtgard is that of Knight. Knighthood in Amtgard is broken into five orders: Battle, Sword, Serpent, Crown, and Flame. Each has different criteria, with some minor variations from Kingdom to Kingdom. A player that is a Knight may play the class of Paladin or Anti-Paladin without wearing a sash, instead wearing a prominent symbol of the Phoenix.

A Knight is allowed to choose members to become their pupils. Should a mutual agreement be reached, the member becomes a Squire to the Knight. Squires follow their Knights and assist them to the fullest of their abilities, on the field and off, in exchange for their tutelage. Often a Squire will assist in making garb for their Knight, as well as weapons or armor, and is usually seen assisting their Knight in combat, when they are together. These relationships tend to transcend the game, as much of the mentorship present in the knight/squire relationship is applicable to the outside world. In most kingdoms, when a player becomes qualified for knighthood the knights in that kingdom vote to decide if the player is ready to join the peerage. Knighthood is not guaranteed upon qualifying, as the award is intended to recognize character as well as achievement. A player is not required to be a squire before being knighted, though squiring for a knight in good standing with the kingdoms circle of knights insures that the hopeful player will be well represented.

== Organization ==
A common theme of medieval and fantasy feudalism runs through even the official level. Amtgard sub-chapters are generally organized by size, with smaller groups (called variously a "shire," "barony," "duchy," or "principality," depending on the number of active members and how long the group has been around) grouped under the larger or older chapters, called "kingdoms." Each sub-chapter is contractually bound to abide by the official Rules of Play (currently version 8.8) and is sponsored and supported by one of the Amtgard kingdoms. Each kingdom is a Not-For-Profit Organization registered in their state of origin.

The kingdoms, along with their primary locations, are:

- The Kingdom of the Burning Lands, El Paso, Texas, Puyallup, Washington
- The Kingdom of the Emerald Hills, Dallas, Texas, Wichita Falls, Texas, Tulsa, Oklahoma, Northwest Arkansas, Arkansas River Valley
- The Celestial Kingdom, Central Texas
- The Empire of the Iron Mountains, Colorado
- The Kingdom of the Golden Plains, Amarillo, Texas
- The Kingdom of Dragonspine, Las Cruces, New Mexico, Tucson, Arizona, Cottonwood, Arizona, Phoenix, Arizona
- The Kingdom of the Wetlands, Southeast Texas, Louisiana
- The Kingdom of Goldenvale, Nashua, New Hampshire
- The Kingdom of Neverwinter, Florida, Georgia, South Carolina
- The Kingdom of the Rising Winds, Indiana, Kentucky, Ohio, Michigan, Wisconsin, Illinois, Minnesota
- The Kingdom of the Black Spire Washington, Oregon,
- The Kingdom of Crystal Groves, Maryland, Virginia, Delaware, West Virginia, Pennsylvania
- The Kingdom of Desert Winds, Utah, Nevada, Colorado, Wyoming, Idaho
- The Kingdom of Tal Dagore, Missouri, Illinois
- The Kingdom of Northern Lights, Western Washington, and Southern Coastal British Columbia
- The Kingdom of Northreach, Alaska
- The Kingdom of Rivermoor, Nebraska, Kansas, Iowa, South Dakota, North Dakota, Minnesota, and Manitoba
- The Kingdom of Polaris, Minnesota, Wisconsin, and Iowa
- The Kingdom of Westmarch, California, Northern Nevada, Hawaii
- The Kingdom of Viridian Outlands, Eastern Washington, Western Canada
- The Kingdom of Winters Edge, North Georgia, Tennessee, Alabama, North Carolina South Carolina Mississippi and Kentucky
- The Kingdom of Nine Blades, Ontario
- The Kingdom of 13 Roads, Illinois

== See also ==
- Boffer
- LARP
- Dagorhir
- Belegarth Medieval Combat Society
- Society for Creative Anachronism
- Swordtag
